Many skin conditions affect the human integumentary system—the organ system covering the entire surface of the body and composed of skin, hair, nails, and related muscle and glands. The major function of this system is as a barrier against the external environment. The skin weighs an average of four kilograms, covers an area of two square metres, and is made of three distinct layers: the epidermis, dermis, and subcutaneous tissue. The two main types of human skin are: glabrous skin, the hairless skin on the palms and soles (also referred to as the "palmoplantar" surfaces), and hair-bearing skin. Within the latter type, the hairs occur in structures called pilosebaceous units, each with hair follicle, sebaceous gland, and associated arrector pili muscle. In the embryo, the epidermis, hair, and glands form from the ectoderm, which is chemically influenced by the underlying mesoderm that forms the dermis and subcutaneous tissues.

The epidermis is the most superficial layer of skin, a squamous epithelium with several strata: the stratum corneum, stratum lucidum, stratum granulosum, stratum spinosum, and stratum basale. Nourishment is provided to these layers by diffusion from the dermis since the epidermis is without direct blood supply.  The epidermis contains four cell types: keratinocytes, melanocytes, Langerhans cells, and Merkel cells. Of these, keratinocytes are the major component, constituting roughly 95 percent of the epidermis. This stratified squamous epithelium is maintained by cell division within the stratum basale, in which differentiating cells slowly displace outwards through the stratum spinosum to the stratum corneum, where cells are continually shed from the surface. In normal skin, the rate of production equals the rate of loss; about two weeks are needed for a cell to migrate from the basal cell layer to the top of the granular cell layer, and an additional two weeks to cross the stratum corneum.

The dermis is the layer of skin between the epidermis and subcutaneous tissue, and comprises two sections, the papillary dermis and the reticular dermis. The superficial papillary dermis interdigitates with the overlying rete ridges of the epidermis, between which the two layers interact through the basement membrane zone. Structural components of the dermis are collagen, elastic fibers, and ground substance. Within these components are the pilosebaceous units, arrector pili muscles, and the eccrine and apocrine glands. The dermis contains two vascular networks that run parallel to the skin surface—one superficial and one deep plexus—which are connected by vertical communicating vessels. The function of blood vessels within the dermis is fourfold: to supply nutrition, to regulate temperature, to modulate inflammation, and to participate in wound healing.

The subcutaneous tissue is a layer of fat between the dermis and underlying fascia. This tissue may be further divided into two components, the actual fatty layer, or panniculus adiposus, and a deeper vestigial layer of muscle, the panniculus carnosus. The main cellular component of this tissue is the adipocyte, or fat cell. The structure of this tissue is composed of septal (i.e. linear strands) and lobular compartments, which differ in microscopic appearance. Functionally, the subcutaneous fat insulates the body, absorbs trauma, and serves as a reserve energy source.

Conditions of the human integumentary system constitute a broad spectrum of diseases, also known as dermatoses, as well as many nonpathologic states (like, in certain circumstances, melanonychia and racquet nails). While only a small number of skin diseases account for most visits to the physician, thousands of skin conditions have been described. Classification of these conditions often presents many nosological challenges, since underlying etiologies and pathogenetics are often not known. Therefore, most current textbooks present a classification based on location (for example, conditions of the mucous membrane), morphology (chronic blistering conditions), etiology (skin conditions resulting from physical factors), and so on. Clinically, the diagnosis of any particular skin condition is made by gathering pertinent information regarding the presenting skin lesion(s), including the location (such as arms, head, legs), symptoms (pruritus, pain), duration (acute or chronic), arrangement (solitary, generalized, annular, linear), morphology (macules, papules, vesicles), and color (red, blue, brown, black, white, yellow). Diagnosis of many conditions often also requires a skin biopsy which yields histologic information that can be correlated with the clinical presentation and any laboratory data.

Acneiform eruptions 
Acneiform eruptions are caused by changes in the pilosebaceous unit.

Acne aestivalis (Mallorca acne)
Acne conglobata
Acne cosmetica (cosmetic acne)
Acne fulminans (acute febrile ulcerative acne)
Acne keloidalis nuchae (acne keloidalis, dermatitis papillaris capillitii, folliculitis keloidalis, folliculitis keloidis nuchae, nuchal keloid acne)
Acne mechanica
Acne medicamentosa
Acne miliaris necrotica (acne varioliformis)
Acne vulgaris (acne simplex)
Acne with facial edema (solid facial edema)
Blepharophyma
Erythrotelangiectatic rosacea (erythematotelangiectatic rosacea, vascular rosacea)
Excoriated acne (acne excoriée des jeunes filles, Picker's acne)
Glandular rosacea
Gnathophyma
Gram-negative rosacea
Granulomatous facial dermatitis
Granulomatous perioral dermatitis
Halogen acne
Hidradenitis suppurativa (acne inversa, pyoderma fistulans significa, Verneuil's disease)
Idiopathic facial aseptic granuloma
Infantile acne
Lupoid rosacea (granulomatous rosacea, micropapular tuberculid, rosacea-like tuberculid of Lewandowsky)
Lupus miliaris disseminatus faciei
Metophyma
Neonatal acne (acne infantum, acne neonatorum, neonatal cephalic pustulosis)
Occupational acne
Oil acne
Ocular rosacea (ophthalmic rosacea, ophthalmorosacea)
Otophyma
Periorificial dermatitis
Persistent edema of rosacea (chronic upper facial erythematous edema, Morbihan's disease, rosaceous lymphedema)
Phymatous rosacea
Pomade acne
Papulopustular rosacea (inflammatory rosacea)
Perifolliculitis capitis abscedens et suffodiens (dissecting cellulitis of the scalp, dissecting folliculitis, perifolliculitis capitis abscedens et suffodiens of Hoffman)
Perioral dermatitis
Periorbital dermatitis (periocular dermatitis)
Pyoderma faciale (rosacea fulminans)
Rhinophyma
Rosacea (acne rosacea)
Rosacea conglobata
Synovitis–acne–pustulosis–hyperostosis–osteomyelitis syndrome (SAPHO syndrome)
Steroid rosacea
Tar acne
Tropical acne

Autoinflammatory syndromes 

Autoinflammatory syndromes are a group of inherited disorders characterized by bouts of inflammatory skin lesions and periodic fevers.

Blau syndrome  
Chronic infantile neurologic cutaneous and articular syndrome
Familial cold urticaria (familial cold autoinflammatory syndrome)
Familial Mediterranean fever
Hyper-IgD syndrome
Majeed syndrome
Muckle–Wells syndrome
TNF receptor associated periodic syndrome (familial Hibernian fever, TRAPS, tumor necrosis factor receptor associated periodic syndrome)

Chronic blistering 

Chronic blistering cutaneous conditions have a prolonged course and present with vesicles and bullae.

Adult linear IgA disease
Bullous pemphigoid
Bullous lupus erythematosus
Childhood linear IgA disease (chronic bullous disease of childhood)
Cicatricial pemphigoid (benign mucosal pemphigoid, benign mucous membrane pemphigoid, ocular pemphigus, scarring pemphigoid)
Dermatitis herpetiformis (Duhring disease)
Endemic pemphigus (endemic pemphigus foliaceus, fogo selvagem)
Epidermolysis bullosa acquisita
Grover's disease (benign papular acantholytic dermatosis, persistent acantholytic dermatosis, transient acantholytic dermatosis)  
IgA pemphigus
Intraepidermal neutrophilic IgA dermatosis
Localized cicatricial pemphigoid (Brunsting–Perry cicatricial pemphigoid)
Paraneoplastic pemphigus
Pemphigus erythematosus (Senear–Usher syndrome)
Pemphigus foliaceus
Pemphigus herpetiformis (acantholytic herpetiform dermatitis, herpetiform pemphigus, mixed bullous disease, pemphigus controlled by sulfapyridine)
Pemphigoid nodularis
Pemphigus vegetans
Pemphigus vegetans of Hallopeau
Pemphigus vegetans of Neumann
Pemphigus vulgaris
Vesicular pemphigoid
Vulvar childhood pemphigoid

Conditions of the mucous membranes 

Conditions of the mucous membranes involve the moist linings of the eyes, nose, mouth, genitals, and anus.

Acatalasia (acatalasemia, Takahara's disease)
Acquired dyskeratotic leukoplakia
Actinic cheilitis (actinic cheilosis)
Acute necrotizing ulcerative gingivitis (acute membranous gingivitis, acute necrotizing ulcerative gingivostomatitis, fusospirillary gingivitis, fusospirillosis, fusospirochetal gingivitis, necrotizing gingivitis, phagedenic gingivitis, trench mouth, ulcerative gingivitis, Vincent gingivitis, Vincent infection, Vincent stomatitis, Vincent's disease)
Allergic contact cheilitis
Angina bullosa haemorrhagica
Angular cheilitis (perlèche)
Behçet's disease (Behçet's syndrome, oculo-oral-genital syndrome)
Black hairy tongue (hairy tongue, lingua villosa nigra) 
Caviar tongue
Cheilitis exfoliativa
Cheilitis glandularis
Cheilitis granulomatosa (granulomatous cheilitis, orofacial granulomatosis)
Cutaneous sinus of dental origin (dental sinus)
Cyclic neutropenia
Desquamative gingivitis
Drug-induced ulcer of the lip
Epidermization of the lip
Epulis
Epulis fissuratum (granuloma fissuratum)
Eruptive lingual papillitis
Erythroplakia (erythroplasia)
Fissured tongue (furrowed tongue, lingua plicata, plicated tongue, scrotal tongue)
Geographic tongue (benign migratory glossitis, benign migratory stomatitis, glossitis areata exfoliativa, glossitis areata migrans, lingua geographica, stomatitis areata migrans, transitory benign plaques of the tongue)
Gingival fibroma
Gingival hypertrophy
Hairy leukoplakia (oral hairy leukoplakia)
Intraoral dental sinus
Linea alba
Leukoplakia
Leukoplakia with tylosis and esophageal carcinoma
Major aphthous ulcer (periadenitis mucosa necrotica recurrens)
Median rhomboid glossitis (central papillary atrophy)
Melanocytic oral lesion
Melkersson–Rosenthal syndrome
Morsicatio buccarum (chronic cheek biting, chronic cheek chewing)
Mucosal squamous cell carcinoma
Mucous cyst of the oral mucosa (mucocele)
Nagayama's spots
Oral Crohn's disease
Oral florid papillomatosis
Oral melanosis
Osseous choristoma of the tongue
Peripheral ameloblastoma
Plasma cell cheilitis (plasma cell gingivitis, plasma cell orificial mucositi)
Plasmoacanthoma
Proliferative verrucous leukoplakia
Pyogenic granuloma (eruptive hemangioma, granulation tissue-type hemangioma, granuloma gravidarum, lobular capillary hemangioma, pregnancy tumor, tumor of pregnancy)  
Pyostomatitis vegetans
Recurrent aphthous stomatitis (aphthosis, canker sores, recurrent oral aphthae)
Recurrent intraoral herpes simplex infection
Smooth tongue (atrophic glossitis, bald tongue, hunter glossitis, moeller)
Stomatitis nicotina (nicotine stomatitis, smoker's keratosis, smoker's patches)
Torus palatinus
Trumpeter's wart
Vestibular papillomatosis
White sponge nevus (white sponge nevus of Cannon)

Conditions of the skin appendages 

Conditions of the skin appendages are those affecting the glands of the skin, hair, nails, and arrector pili muscles.

Acne necrotica
Acquired generalized hypertrichosis (acquired hypertrichosis lanuginosa, hypertrichosis lanuginosa acquisita)
Acquired perforating dermatosis (acquired perforating collagenosis)
Acrokeratosis paraneoplastica of Bazex (acrokeratosis neoplastica, Bazex syndrome)
Acroosteolysis
Acute paronychia
Alopecia areata 
Alopecia neoplastica
Anagen effluvium
Androgenic alopecia (androgenetic alopecia)
Anhidrosis (hypohidrosis)
Anonychia
Apparent leukonychia
Beau's lines
Blue nails
Bromidrosis (apocrine bromhidrosis, fetid sweat, malodorous sweating, osmidrosis)
Bubble hair deformity
Central centrifugal cicatricial alopecia (follicular degeneration syndrome, pseudopelade of the central scalp)
Chevron nail (herringbone nail)
Chromhidrosis (colored sweat)
Chronic paronychia
Cicatricial alopecia
Clubbing (drumstick fingers, Hippocratic fingers, watch-glass nails)
Congenital onychodysplasia of the index fingers
Disseminate and recurrent infundibulofolliculitis
Erosive pustular dermatitis of the scalp (erosive pustular dermatosis of the scalp)
Erythromelanosis follicularis faciei et colli
Folliculitis decalvans
Folliculitis nares perforans
Fox–Fordyce disease
Frontal fibrosing alopecia
Generalized congenital hypertrichosis (congenital hypertrichosis lanuginosa)
Generalized hyperhidrosis
Graham-Little syndrome
Granulosis rubra nasi
Green nails
Gustatory hyperhidrosis
Hair casts (pseudonits)
Hair follicle nevus (vellus hamartoma)
Hairy palms and soles
Half and half nails (Lindsay's nails)
Hangnail
Hapalonychia
Hematidrosis
Hirsutism
Hook nail
Hot comb alopecia
Hypertrichosis cubiti (hairy elbow syndrome)
Hypertrichosis simplex of the scalp
Intermittent hair–follicle dystrophy
Keratosis pilaris atrophicans
Kinking hair (acquired progressive kinking)
Koenen's tumor (Koenen's periungual fibroma, periungual fibroma)
Koilonychia (spoon nails)
Kyrle disease
Leukonychia (white nails)
Lichen planopilaris (acuminatus, follicular lichen planus, lichen planus follicularis, peripilaris)
Lichen planus of the nails
Lichen spinulosus (keratosis spinulosa)
Lipedematous alopecia (lipedematous scalp)
Localized acquired hypertrichosis
Localized congenital hypertrichosis
Longitudinal erythronychia
Longitudinal melanonychia
Loose anagen syndrome (loose anagen hair syndrome)
Lupus erythematosus
Madarosis
Malalignment of the nail plate
Male-pattern baldness
Marie–Unna hereditary hypotrichosis (Marie–Unna hypotrichosis)
Median nail dystrophy (dystrophia unguis mediana canaliformis, median canaliform dystrophy of Heller, solenonychia)
Mees' lines
Melanonychia
Menkes kinky hair syndrome (kinky hair disease, Menkes disease)
Monilethrix (beaded hair)
Muehrcke's nails (Muehrcke's lines)
Nail–patella syndrome (Fong syndrome, hereditary osteoonychodysplasia, HOOD syndrome) 
Neoplasms of the nailbed
Nevoid hypertrichosis
Noncicatricial alopecia
Onychauxis
Onychoatrophy
Onychocryptosis (ingrown nail, unguis incarnatus)
Onychogryphosis (ram's horn nails)
Onycholysis
Onychomadesis
Onychomatricoma
Onychophagia (nail biting)
Onychophosis
Onychoptosis defluvium (alopecia unguium)
Onychorrhexis (brittle nails)
Onychoschizia
Onychotillomania
Ophiasis
Palmoplantar hyperhidrosis (emotional hyperhidrosis)
Parakeratosis pustulosa
Patterned acquired hypertrichosis
Perforating folliculitis
Pili annulati (ringed hair)
Pili bifurcati
Pili multigemini
Pili pseudoannulati (pseudo pili annulati)
Pili torti (twisted hairs)
Pincer nails (omega nails, trumpet nails)
Pityriasis amiantacea (tinea amiantacea)
Platonychia
Plica neuropathica (felted hair)
Plummer's nail
Premature greying of hair
Prepubertal hypertrichosis
Pressure alopecia (postoperative alopecia, pressure-induced alopecia)
Pseudofolliculitis barbae (barber's itch, folliculitis barbae traumatica, razor bumps, scarring pseudofolliculitis of the beard, shave bumps)
Pseudopelade of Brocq (alopecia cicatrisata)
Psoriatic nails
Pterygium inversum unguis (pterygium inversus unguis, ventral pterygium)
Pterygium unguis (dorsal pterygium)
Purpura of the nail bed
Racquet nail (brachyonychia, nail en raquette, racquet thumb)
Recurrent palmoplantar hidradenitis (idiopathic palmoplantar hidradenitis, idiopathic plantar hidradenitis, painful plantar erythema, palmoplantar eccrine hidradenitis, plantar panniculitis)
Red lunulae
Ross' syndrome
Rubinstein–Taybi syndrome
Setleis syndrome
Shell nail syndrome
Short anagen syndrome
Splinter hemorrhage 
Spotted lunulae
Staining of the nail plate
Stippled nails
Subungual hematoma
Telogen effluvium
Terry's nails
Traction alopecia
Traumatic alopecia
Traumatic anserine folliculosis
Triangular alopecia (temporal alopecia, temporal triangular alopecia)
Trichomegaly
Trichomycosis axillaris
Trichorrhexis invaginata (bamboo hair)
Trichorrhexis nodosa
Trichostasis spinulosa
Tufted folliculitis
Tumor alopecia
Twenty-nail dystrophy (sandpapered nails, trachyonychia)
Uncombable hair syndrome (cheveux incoiffable, pili trianguli et canaliculi, spun-glass hair)
Wooly hair nevus (woolly hair nevus)
X-linked hypertrichosis

Conditions of the subcutaneous fat 

Conditions of the subcutaneous fat are those affecting the layer of adipose tissue that lies between the dermis and underlying fascia.

Acquired generalized lipodystrophy (Lawrence syndrome, Lawrence–Seip syndrome)
Adiposis dolorosa (Dercum's disease)
Alpha-1 antitrypsin deficiency panniculitis (alpha1-protease deficiency panniculitis, alpha1-proteinase deficiency panniculitis)
Atrophic connective tissue panniculitis
Barraquer–Simons syndrome (acquired partial lipodystrophy, cephalothoracic lipodystrophy, progressive lipodystrophy)
Benign symmetric lipomatosis (benign symmetric lipomatosis of Launois–Bensaude, Madelung's disease)
Centrifugal abdominal lipodystrophy (centrifugal lipodystrophy, lipodystrophia centrifugalis abdominalis infantalis)
Chronic erythema nodosum (erythema nodosum migrans, subacute migratory panniculitis of Vilanova and Piñol, subacute nodular migratory panniculitis) 
Cold panniculitis (popsicle panniculitis)
Congenital generalized lipodystrophy (Berardinelli–Seip syndrome)
Cytophagic histiocytic panniculitis
Drug-induced lipodystrophy
Factitial panniculitis
Familial partial lipodystrophy (Köbberling–Dunnigan syndrome)
Gouty panniculitis
Hemihyperplasia–multiple lipomatosis syndrome
HIV-associated lipodystrophy
Involutional lipoatrophy
Lipoatrophia annularis (Ferreira–Marques lipoatrophia)
Lipoatrophia semicircularis (semicircular lipoatrophy)
Lipodermatosclerosis (chronic panniculitis with lipomembranous changes, hypodermitis sclerodermiformis, sclerosing panniculitis, stasis panniculitis)
Lipohypertrophy
Localized lipodystrophy
Neutrophilic lobular panniculitis
Nodular vasculitis
Non-progressive late-onset linear hemifacial lipoatrophy
Pancreatic panniculitis (enzymatic panniculitis, pancreatic fat necrosis, subcutaneous fat necrosis)
Poland's syndrome
Post-steroid panniculitis
Sclerema neonatorum
Sclerosing lipogranuloma (paraffinoma)
Septal panniculitis
Subcutaneous fat necrosis of the newborn
Traumatic panniculitis
Tumor lysis syndrome
Weber–Christian disease (relapsing febrile nonsuppurative panniculitis)

Congenital anomalies 

Cutaneous congenital anomalies are a diverse group of disorders that result from faulty morphogenesis, the biological process that forms the shape of a human body.

Accessory nail of the fifth toe
Accessory tragus (ear tag, preauricular appendage, preauricular tag)
Amniotic band syndrome (ADAM complex, amniotic band sequence, congenital constriction bands, pseudoainhum)
Aplasia cutis congenita (cutis aplasia, congenital absence of skin, congenital scars) 
Arteriovenous fistula
Benign neonatal hemangiomatosis
Branchial cyst (branchial cleft cyst)
Bronchogenic cyst
Capillary hemangioma (infantile hemangioma, nevus maternus, strawberry hemangioma, strawberry nevus)
Cavernous venous malformation
Congenital cartilaginous rest of the neck (cervical accessory tragus, wattle)
Congenital erosive and vesicular dermatosis
Congenital hypertrophy of the lateral fold of the hallux
Congenital lip pit (congenital sinus of the lower lip, lip sinus, midline sinus of the upper lip)
Congenital malformations of the dermatoglyphs
Congenital smooth muscle hamartoma
Cystic lymphatic malformation
Dermoid cyst
Diffuse neonatal hemangiomatosis
Encephalocele
Familial disseminated comedones without dyskeratosis
Focal facial dermal dysplasia
Hutchinson's teeth
Hyperkeratotic cutaneous capillary-venous malformation
Intrauterine epidermal necrosis
Limb–mammary syndrome
Lowry–MacLean syndrome
Macrocheilia
Macrocystic lymphatic malformation
Malignant pilomatricoma (pilomatrical carcinoma, pilomatrix carcinoma)
Maternal autoimmune bullous disease
Median raphe cyst
Melanotic neuroectodermal tumor of infancy
Membranous aplasia cutis
Microcystic lymphatic malformation
Midline cervical cleft
Mongolian spot (congenital dermal melanocytosis, dermal melanocytosis) 
Mulberry molar
Nager acrofacial dysostosis
Nasal glioma (brain-like heterotopia, cephalic brain-like heterotopia, glial hamartoma, heterotopic neuroglial tissue, nasal cerebral heterotopia, nasal heterotopic brain tissue)
Nasolacrimal duct cyst
Nevus psiloliparus
Non-involuting congenital hemangioma
Omphalomesenteric duct cyst (omphalomesenteric duct remnant, vitelline cyst)
PELVIS syndrome
Pilomatricoma (calcifying epithelioma of Malherbe, Malherbe calcifying epithelioma, pilomatrixoma)
Poland anomaly
Posterior fossa malformations–hemangiomas–arterial anomalies–cardiac defects–eye abnormalities–sternal cleft and supraumbilical raphe syndrome (PHACE association, PHACES syndrome)
Preauricular sinus and cyst (ear pit, congenital auricular fistula, congenital preauricular fistula, preauricular cyst)
Rapidly involuting congenital hemangioma (congenital nonprogressive hemangioma)
Rosenthal–Kloepfer syndrome
Rudimentary supernumerary digit (rudimentary polydactyly)
SACRAL syndrome
Sinus pericranii
Skin dimple (skin fossa)
Superficial lymphatic malformation (lymphangioma circumscriptum)
Supernumerary nipple (accessory nipple, pseudomamma)
Thyroglossal duct cyst
Verrucous vascular malformation (angiokeratoma circumscriptum naeviforme)

Connective tissue diseases 

Connective tissue diseases are caused by a complex array of autoimmune responses that target or affect collagen or ground substance.

Acute cutaneous lupus erythematosus
Atrophoderma of Pasini and Pierini (dyschromic and atrophic variation of scleroderma, morphea plana atrophica, sclérodermie atrophique d'emblée)
Calcinosis–Raynaud phenomenon–esophageal dysmotility–sclerodactyly–telangiectasia syndrome (CREST syndrome)
Chilblain lupus erythematosus (chilblain lupus erythematosus of Hutchinson)
Childhood dermatomyositis
Childhood discoid lupus erythematosus
Childhood systemic lupus erythematosus
Complement deficiency syndromes
Dermatomyositis
Ehlers–Danlos syndrome
Eosinophilia–myalgia syndrome
Frontal linear scleroderma (en coup de sabre, morphea en coup de sabre) 
Generalized discoid lupus erythematosus
Generalized morphea
Interstitial granulomatous dermatitis
Juvenile rheumatoid arthritis (juvenile idiopathic arthritis, Still's disease)
Keloid morphea
Linear atrophoderma of Moulin (Moulin atrophoderma linearis)
Linear scleroderma
Localized discoid lupus erythematosus
Localized morphea 
Lupus erythematosus panniculitis (lupus erythematosus profundus, lupus panniculitis, lupus profundus, subcutaneous lupus erythematosus)
Lupus erythematosus–lichen planus overlap syndrome (lichen planus–lupus erythematosus overlap syndrome)
Methotrexate-induced papular eruption
Mixed connective tissue disease (Sharp's syndrome, undifferentiated connective tissue disease)
Morphea profunda
Morphea–lichen sclerosus et atrophicus overlap
Mouth and genital ulcers with inflamed cartilage syndrome (MAGIC syndrome)
Neonatal lupus erythematosus
Nephrogenic systemic fibrosis (nephrogenic fibrosing dermopathy)
Nicolau–Balus syndrome
Nodulosis–arthropathy–osteolysis syndrome
Normophosphatemic familial tumoral calcinosis
Palisaded neutrophilic and granulomatous dermatitis
Pansclerotic morphea
Parry–Romberg syndrome (progressive hemifacial atrophy)
Progressive systemic sclerosis
Relapsing polychondritis (atrophic polychondritis, systemic chondromalacia)
Rheumatoid arthritis
Rheumatoid nodulosis (accelerated rheumatoid nodulosis)
Rheumatoid vasculitis
Rowell's syndrome
Scleredema adultorum (Bushke disease, scleredema diabeticorum, scleredema adultorum of Buschke, scleredema of Buschke)
Silicosis
Sjögren's syndrome (Mikulicz disease, Sicca syndrome)
Subacute cutaneous lupus erythematosus
Systemic lupus erythematosus
Toxic oil syndrome
Tumid lupus erythematosus (lupus erythematosus tumidus)
Tuzun syndrome
Verrucous lupus erythematosus (hypertrophic lupus erythematosus)
Winchester syndrome

Abnormalities of dermal fibrous and elastic tissue 

Abnormalities of dermal fibrous and elastic tissue are caused by problems in the regulation of collagen synthesis or degradation.
Acrodermatitis chronica atrophicans (Herxheimer disease, primary diffuse atrophy)
Actinic elastosis (solar elastosis)
Anetoderma (anetoderma maculosa, anetoderma maculosa cutis, atrophia maculosa cutis, macular atrophy)
Blepharochalasis
Cutis laxa (chalazoderma, dermatochalasia, dermatolysis, dermatomegaly, generalized elastolysis, generalized elastorrhexis, pachydermatocele)
Cutis rhomboidalis nuchae
Ehlers–Danlos syndrome (cutis hyperelastica, elastic skin, India rubber skin)
Elastosis perforans serpiginosa
Homocystinuria
Jadassohn–Pellizzari anetoderma
Linear focal elastosis (elastotic striae)
Loeys–Dietz syndrome
Marfan syndrome
Occipital horn syndrome
Osteogenesis imperfecta (Lobstein syndrome)
Perforating calcific elastosis (localized acquired cutaneous pseudoxanthoma elasticum, perforating periumbilical calcific elastosis, periumbilical perforating pseudoxanthoma elasticum)
Pseudoxanthoma elasticum (Grönblad–Strandberg syndrome)
Reactive perforating collagenosis
Schweninger–Buzzi anetoderma
Sclerotic fibroma
Striae atrophicans
Striae distensae 
Ullrich disease
Verrucous perforating collagenoma
Wrinkly skin syndrome

Dermal and subcutaneous growths 

Dermal and subcutaneous growths result from (1) reactive or neoplastic proliferation of cellular components of the dermis or subcutaneous tissue, or (2) neoplasms invading or aberrantly present in the dermis.

Acquired progressive lymphangioma (benign lymphangioendothelioma)
Acral arteriolar ectasia
Acral fibrokeratoma (acquired digital fibrokeratoma, acquired periungual fibrokeratoma)
Acrochordon (cutaneous papilloma, cutaneous tag, fibroepithelial polyp, fibroma molluscum, fibroma pendulum, papilloma colli, skin tag, soft fibroma, Templeton skin tag)
Adenoma sebaceum
Adult type of generalized eruption of cutaneous mastocytosis
African cutaneous Kaposi sarcoma
African lymphadenopathic Kaposi sarcoma
Aggressive infantile fibromatosis
AIDS-associated Kaposi sarcoma
Ainhum (bankokerend, dactylolysis spontanea, sukhapakla)
Angiofibroma
Angiokeratoma
Angiokeratoma of Fordyce (angiokeratoma of the scrotum and vulva) 
Angiokeratoma of Mibelli (Mibelli's angiokeratoma, telangiectatic warts)
Angioleiomyoma (vascular leiomyoma)
Angiolipoleiomyoma
Angiolipoma
Angioma serpiginosum
Angiosarcoma
Aponeurotic fibroma (calcifying aponeurotic fibroma, juvenile aponeurotic fibroma)
Atypical fibroxanthoma
Benign lipoblastomatosis (embryonic lipoma)
Buschke–Ollendorff syndrome (dermatofibrosis lenticularis disseminata)
Capillary aneurysms
Carcinoid
Cellular angiofibroma
Cherry angioma (De Morgan spot, senile angioma)
Chondrodermatitis nodularis chronica helicis (chondrodermatitis nodularis helicis) 
Chondroid lipoma
Chordoma
Classic Kaposi sarcoma
Collagenous fibroma (desmoplastic fibroblastoma)
Composite hemangioendothelioma
Connective tissue nevus (collagenoma, elastoma, shagreen patch)
Cutaneous endometriosis
Cutaneous meningioma (heterotopic meningeal tissue, rudimentary meningocele)
Cutaneous myelofibrosis
Cutaneous myxoma
Cutis marmorata telangiectatica congenita (congenital generalized phlebectasia, Van Lohuizen syndrome)
Dermal dendrocyte hamartoma
Dermatofibroma (benign fibrous histiocytoma, dermal dendrocytoma, fibrous dermatofibroma, fibrous histiocytoma, fibroma simplex, histiocytoma, nodular subepidermal fibrosis, sclerosing hemangioma)
Dermatofibrosarcoma protuberans
Desmoid tumor
Diffuse cutaneous mastocytosis
Diffuse infantile fibromatosis
Dupuytren's contracture (Dupuytren's diathesis, Dupuytren's disease, palmar fibromatosis)
Eccrine angiomatous hamartoma
Elastofibroma dorsi
Endovascular papillary angioendothelioma (Dabska tumor, Dabska-type hemangioendothelioma, hobnail hemangioendothelioma, malignant endovascular papillary angioendothelioma, papillary intralymphatic angioendothelioma)
Epithelioid cell histiocytoma
Epithelioid hemangioendothelioma
Epithelioid sarcoma
Erythrodermic mastocytosis
Extraskeletal chondroma (chondroma of soft parts)
Familial myxovascular fibromas
Fascial hernia
Fibroma of tendon sheath
Fibromatosis colli (sternomastoid tumor of infancy)
Fibrous hamartoma of infancy
Fibrous papule of the nose (benign solitary fibrous papule, fibrous papule of the face)
Folded skin with scarring (Michelin tire baby syndrome)
Fordyce's spot (Fordyce's disease) 
Ganglion cyst
Ganglioneuroma
Gardner fibroma
Genital leiomyoma (dartoic leiomyoma)
Giant cell fibroblastoma
Giant cell tumor of the tendon sheath (giant cell synovioma, localized nodular tenosynovitis, pigmented villonodular synovitis)
Glomeruloid hemangioma
Glomus tumor (glomangioma, solid glomus tumor, solitary glomus tumor)
Granular cell tumor (Abrikossoff's tumor, Abrikossov's tumor, granular cell myoblastoma, granular cell nerve sheath tumor, granular cell schwannoma)
Hamartoma
Hemangiopericytoma
Hemangiosarcoma
Hibernoma (fetal lipoma, lipoma of embryonic fat, lipoma of immature adipose tissue)
Hypertrophic scar
Immunosuppression-associated Kaposi sarcoma
Infantile digital fibromatosis (inclusion body fibromatosis, infantile digital myofibroblastoma, Reye tumor)
Infantile hemangiopericytoma (congenital hemangiopericytoma)
Infantile myofibromatosis (congenital generalized fibromatosis, congenital multicentric fibromatosis)
Infantile systemic hyalinosis (juvenile systemic hyalinosis)
Intradermal spindle cell lipoma
Intravascular papillary endothelial hyperplasia (Masson's hemangio-endotheliome vegetant intravasculaire, Masson's lesion, Masson's pseudoangiosarcoma, Masson's tumor, papillary endothelial hyperplasia)
Juvenile hyaline fibromatosis (fibromatosis hyalinica multiplex juvenilis, Murray–Puretic–Drescher syndrome)
Kaposiform hemangioendothelioma (infantile kaposiform hemangioendothelioma)
Kasabach–Merritt syndrome (hemangioma with thrombocytopenia)
Keloid (Keloidal scar) 
Keratinizing metaplasia
Keratocyst
Klippel–Trenaunay syndrome (angioosteohypertrophy syndrome, hemangiectatic hypertrophy)
Knuckle pads (heloderma)
Leiomyosarcoma
Lipoma
Liposarcoma (atypical lipoma, atypical lipomatous tumor)
Lymphangiectasis (lymphangioma)
Lymphangiomatosis
Malignant fibrous histiocytoma
Malignant peripheral nerve sheath tumor (malignant schwannoma, neurofibrosarcoma, neurosarcoma)
Mast cell sarcoma
Meningocele
Metastatic carcinoma
Microvenular hemangioma (microcapillary hemangioma)
Midline nevus flammeus (angel's kiss, salmon patch)
Multifocal lymphangioendotheliomatosis (congenital cutaneovisceral angiomatosis with thrombocytopenia, multifocal lymphangioendotheliomatosis with thrombocytopenia)
Multinucleate cell angiohistocytoma
Multiple cutaneous and uterine leiomyomatosis syndrome (leiomyomatosis cutis et uteri, multiple leiomyomatosis, Reed's syndrome)
Multiple cutaneous leiomyoma (pilar leiomyoma)
Neural fibrolipoma
Neuroblastoma (infantile neuroblastoma, neuroepithelioma)
Neuroma cutis
Neurothekeoma (bizarre cutaneous neurofibroma, cutaneous lobular neuromyxoma, myxoma of the nerve sheath, myxomatous perineurioma, nerve sheath myxoma)
Nevus flammeus (capillary malformation, port-wine stain)
Nevus flammeus nuchae (stork bite)
Nevus lipomatosus superficialis (nevus lipomatosis of Hoffman and Zurhelle)
Nevus oligemicus
Nodular fasciitis (nodular pseudosarcomatous fasciits, pseudosarcomatous fasciitis, subcutaneous pseudosarcomatous fibromatosis)
Oral submucous fibrosis
Pachydermodactyly
Palisaded encapsulated neuroma
Paraneoplastic syndrome
Pearly penile papules (hirsuties coronae glandis, hirsutoid papillomas)
Peyronie's disease (induratio penis plastica)
Phakomatosis pigmentovascularis
Piloleiomyoma
Plantar fibromatosis (Ledderhose's disease)
Pleomorphic fibroma
Pleomorphic lipoma
Plexiform fibrohistiocytic tumor
Porokeratotic eccrine ostial and dermal duct nevus
Progressive nodular histiocytoma
Proliferating angioendotheliomatosis
Prominent inferior labial artery
Pseudo-ainhum

Retiform hemangioendothelioma (hobnail hemangioendothelioma)
Schwannoma (acoustic neuroma, neurilemmoma, neurinoma, neurolemmoma, Schwann cell tumor)
Solitary angiokeratoma
Solitary cutaneous leiomyoma
Solitary mastocytoma
Solitary neurofibroma (plexiform neurofibroma, solitary nerve sheath tumor, sporadic neurofibroma)
Spider angioma (nevus araneus, spider telangiectasia, spider nevus, vascular spider)
Spindle cell hemangioendothelioma (spindle cell hemangioma)
Spindle cell lipoma
Sternal cleft
Subungual exostosis
Superficial acral fibromyxoma
Systemic mastocytosis
Targetoid hemosiderotic hemangioma (hobnail hemangioma)
Telangiectasia
Telangiectasia macularis eruptiva perstans
Teratoma
Tufted angioma (acquired tufted angioma, angioblastoma, angioblastoma of Nakagawa, hypertrophic hemangioma, progressive capillary hemangioma, tufted hemangioma)
Umbilical granuloma
Universal angiomatosis (generalized telangiectasia)
Urticaria pigmentosa (childhood type of generalized eruption of cutaneous mastocytosis)
Venous lake (phlebectasis) 
Wildervanck syndrome
Xanthelasmoidal mastocytosis
Zosteriform metastasis

Dermatitis 

Dermatitis is a general term for "inflammation of the skin".

Childhood granulomatous periorificial dermatitis
Essential dermatitis

Atopic 

Atopic dermatitis is a chronic dermatitis associated with a hereditary tendency to develop allergies to food and inhalant substances.

Atopic dermatitis (atopic eczema, disseminated neurodermatitis, flexural eczema, infantile eczema, prurigo diathsique)

Contact 

Contact dermatitis is caused by certain substances coming in contact with the skin.

Abietic acid dermatitis
Acid-induced
Acrylic monomer dermatitis
Adhesive dermatitis
African blackwood dermatitis
Airbag dermatitis (airbag burn)
Alkali-induced
Allergic
Antifungal agent-induced
Antimicrobial agent-induced
Arsenic dermatitis
Artificial nail-induced
Axillary antiperspirant-induced
Axillary deodorant-induced
Baboon syndrome
Black dermatographism
Bleaching cream-induced
Capsaisin-induced
Chemical burn 
Chloracne
Chrome dermatitis
Clothing-induced
Cobalt dermatitis
Contact stomatitis (contact lichenoid reaction, lichenoid amalgam reaction, oral mucosal cinnamon reaction)
Contact urticaria
Corticosteroid-induced
Cosmetic dermatitis
Cosmetic intolerance syndrome
Dentifrice-induced
Dermatitis from metals and metal salts
Dust-induced
Epoxy resin dermatitis
Ethylenediamine-induced
Eye makeup-induced
Fiberglass dermatitis
Flower-induced
Formaldehyde-induced
Formaldehyde-releasing agent-induced
Fragrance-induced
Gold dermatitis
Hair bleach-induced
Hair dye-induced
Hair lotion-induced
Hair spray-induced
Hair straightener-induced
Hair tonic-induced
Houseplant-induced
Hydrocarbon-induced
Irritant folliculitis
Lacquer dermatitis (lacquer sensitivity)
Lanolin-induced
Lipstick-induced
Local anesthetic-induced
Makassar ebony dermatitis
Marine plant-induced
Mechanical irritant dermatitis
Mercury dermatitis
Mouthwash-induced
Nail lacquer-induced
Nail polish remover-induced
Nickel dermatitis
Occupation-induced
p-Chloro-meta-xylenol-induced
Paraben-induced
Paraphenylenediamine dermatitis
Permanent wave preparation-induced
Phenothiazine drug-induced
Photoallergic
Photoirritant
Plant derivative-induced
Pollen-induced
Polyester resin dermatitis
Propylene glycol-induced 
Protein contact dermatitis
Quaternium-15 hypersensitivity
Reed dermatitis
Rosewood dermatitis
Rosin dermatitis
Rubber dermatitis
Seed-induced
Shoe dermatitis
Solvent-induced
Sorbic acid-induced
Subjective irritant contact dermatitis (sensory irritant contact dermatitis)
Sunscreen-induced
Systemic contact dermatitis
Tear gas dermatitis
Textile dermatitis
Traumatic irritant contact dermatitis
Tree-associated plant-induced
Tree-induced
Tulip fingers
Urshiol-induced 
Vegetable-induced

Eczema 

Eczema refers to a broad range of conditions that begin as spongiotic dermatitis and may progress to a lichenified stage.

Autoimmune estrogen dermatitis
Autoimmune progesterone dermatitis
Autosensitization dermatitis
Breast eczema (nipple eczema)
Chronic vesiculobullous hand eczema
Circumostomy eczema
Dyshidrosis (acute vesiculobullous hand eczema, cheiropompholyx, dyshidrotic eczema, pompholyx, podopompholyx)
Ear eczema
Eyelid dermatitis
Hand eczema
Hyperkeratotic hand dermatitis
Id reaction (disseminated eczema, generalized eczema)
Irritant diaper dermatitis (diaper dermatitis, napkin dermatitis)
Juvenile plantar dermatosis (atopic winter feet, dermatitis plantaris sicca, forefoot dermatitis, moon-boot foot syndrome, sweaty sock dermatitis)
Molluscum dermatitis
Nummular dermatitis (discoid eczema, microbial eczema, nummular eczema, nummular neurodermatitis)
Nutritional deficiency eczema
Sulzberger–Garbe syndrome (oid-oid disease)
Xerotic eczema (asteatotic eczema, desiccation dermatitis, eczema craquelé, pruritus hiemalis, winter eczema, winter itch)

Pustular 

Pustular dermatitis is an inflammation of the skin that presents with pustular lesions.

Eosinophilic pustular folliculitis (Ofuji's disease, sterile eosinophilic pustulosis)
Reactive arthritis 
Subcorneal pustular dermatosis (Sneddon–Wilkinson disease)

Seborrheic 

Seborrheic dermatitis is a chronic, superficial, inflammatory disease characterized by scaling on an erythematous base.

Infantile seborrheic dermatitis
Leiner's disease
Pityriasis simplex capillitii (dandruff)
Seborrheic dermatitis (seborrheic eczema)

Disturbances of pigmentation 

Disturbances of human pigmentation, either loss or reduction, may be related to loss of melanocytes or the inability of melanocytes to produce melanin or transport melanosomes correctly.

Albinism–black lock–cell migration disorder of the neurocytes of the gut–deafness syndrome (ABCD syndrome)
Albinism–deafness syndrome (Woolf syndrome, Ziprkowski–Margolis syndrome)
Alezzandrini syndrome
Argyria
Arsenic poisoning 
Berlin syndrome
Pigmentation changes caused by the bioaccumulation of pigments, e.g. Canthaxanthin
Chédiak–Higashi syndrome
Chrysiasis
Cross–McKusick–Breen syndrome (Cross syndrome, oculocerebral-hypopigmentation syndrome)
Dermatopathia pigmentosa reticularis (dermatopathia pigmentosa reticularis hyperkeratotica et mutilans, dermatopathia pigmentosa reticularis hypohidotica et atrophica, dermatopathic pigmentosa reticularis)
Dyschromatosis symmetrica hereditaria (reticulate acropigmentation of Dohi, symmetrical dyschromatosis of the extremities)
Dyschromatosis universalis hereditaria
Elejalde syndrome (Griscelli syndrome type 1)
Eruptive hypomelanosis
Familial progressive hyperpigmentation
Galli–Galli disease
Griscelli syndrome type 2 (partial albinism with immunodeficiency)
Griscelli syndrome type 3
Hemochromatosis (bronze diabetes)
Hemosiderin hyperpigmentation
Hermansky–Pudlak syndrome
Idiopathic guttate hypomelanosis (leukopathia symmetrica progressiva)
Iron metallic discoloration
Klein–Waardenburg syndrome
Lead poisoning
Leukoderma
Melanoma-associated leukoderma
Melasma (chloasma faciei, mask of pregnancy)
Mukamel syndrome
Necklace of Venus
Nevus anemicus 
Nevus depigmentosus (nevus achromicus)
Ocular albinism
Oculocutaneous albinism
Pallister–Killian syndrome
Periorbital hyperpigmentation
Photoleukomelanodermatitis of Kobori
Phylloid hypomelanosis
Piebaldism
Pigmentatio reticularis faciei et colli
Pityriasis alba
Poikiloderma of Civatte
Poikiloderma vasculare atrophicans
Postinflammatory hyperpigmentation (postinflammatory hypermelanosis)
Postinflammatory hypopigmentation
Progressive macular hypomelanosis
Quadrichrome vitiligo
Reticular pigmented anomaly of the flexures (dark dot disease, Dowling–Degos' disease)
Reticulate acropigmentation of Kitamura
Revesz syndrome
Riehl melanosis
Scratch dermatitis (flagellate pigmentation from bleomycin)
Segmental vitiligo
Shah–Waardenburg syndrome
Shiitake mushroom dermatitis (flagellate mushroom dermatitis, mushroom worker's disease, shiitake-induced toxicoderma)
Tar melanosis (melanodermatitis toxica lichenoides)
Tietz syndrome
Titanium metallic discoloration
Transient neonatal pustular melanosis (transient neonatal pustulosis, lentigines neonatorum)
Trichrome vitiligo
Vagabond's leukomelanoderma
Vasospastic macule
Vitiligo
Vitiligo ponctué
Vogt–Koyanagi–Harada syndrome
Waardenburg syndrome
Wende–Bauckus syndrome (Pegum syndrome)
Woronoff's ring
X-linked reticulate pigmentary disorder (familial cutaneous amyloidosis, Partington amyloidosis, Partington cutaneous amyloidosis, Partington syndrome type II, reticulate pigmentary disorder, X-linked reticulate pigmentary disorder with systemic manifestations)
Yemenite deaf-blind hypopigmentation syndrome

Drug eruptions 

Drug eruptions are adverse drug reactions that present with cutaneous manifestations.

Acrodynia (calomel disease, erythredemic polyneuropathy, pink disease)
Acute generalized exanthematous pustulosis (pustular drug eruption, toxic pustuloderma) 
Adverse reaction to biologic agents
Adverse reaction to cytokines
Allopurinol hypersensitivity syndrome
Anticoagulant-induced skin necrosis
Anticonvulsant hypersensitivity syndrome
Bromoderma
Bullous drug reaction (bullous drug eruption, generalized bullous fixed drug eruption, multilocular bullous fixed drug eruption)
Chemotherapy-induced acral erythema (palmoplantar erythrodysesthesia syndrome)
Chemotherapy-induced hyperpigmentation
Drug-induced acne
Drug-induced angioedema
Drug-related gingival hyperplasia
Drug-induced lichenoid reaction (drug-induced lichen planus, lichenoid drug eruption)
Drug-induced lupus erythematosus
Drug-induced nail changes
Drug-induced pigmentation
Drug-induced pseudolymphoma
Drug-induced urticaria
Erythema multiforme major (erythema multiforme minor–erythema multiforme von Hebra)
Exudative hyponychial dermatitis
Fixed drug reaction
Halogenoderma
Heparin necrosis
HIV disease-related drug reaction
Hydroxyurea dermopathy
Injection site reaction
Iododerma
Leukotriene receptor antagonist-associated Churg–Strauss syndrome
Linear IgA bullous dermatosis (linear IgA dermatosis)
Photosensitive drug reaction
Red man syndrome
Severe cutaneous adverse reactions (includes DRESS syndrome, Steven Johnson syndrome, Toxic epidermal necrolysis, Stevens-Johnson/toxic epidermal necrolysis overlap syndrome, and Acute generalized exanthematous pustulosis)
Scleroderma-like reaction to taxanes
Serum sickness-like reaction
Steroid acne
Steroid folliculitis
Stevens–Johnson syndrome
Sulfonamide hypersensitivity syndrome
Texier's disease
Toxic epidermal necrolysis (Lyell's syndrome)
Urticarial erythema multiforme
Vitamin K reaction
Warfarin necrosis

Endocrine-related 

Endocrine conditions often present with cutaneous findings as the skin interacts with the endocrine system in many ways.

Acanthosis nigricans associated with malignancy (acanthosis nigricans type I)
Acanthosis nigricans associated with obesity, insulin-resistant states, and endocrinopathy (acanthosis nigricans type III)
Acral acanthosis nigricans (acral acanthotic anomaly) 
Acral dry gangrene
Acromegaly
Addison's disease
Adrenal adenoma
Adrenal carcinoma
Adrenal hyperplasia
Alopecia–nail dystrophy–ophthalmic complications–thyroid dysfunction–hypohidrosis–ephelides and enteropathy–respiratory tract infections syndrome (ANOTHER syndrome)
Arrhenoblastoma
Cretinism
Cushing's syndrome 
Excess ovarian androgen release syndrome (ovarian SAHA syndrome)
Familial acanthosis nigricans (acanthosis nigricans type II)
Growth hormone deficiency
Hyperandrogenism–insulin resistance–acanthosis nigricans syndrome (HAIR-AN syndrome)
Hyperparathyroidism
Hyperprolactinemic SAHA syndrome
Hyperthyroidism
Hypoparathyroidism
Hypothyroidism
Leydig cell tumor
Multiple endocrine neoplasia type 1 (Wermer syndrome)
Multiple endocrine neoplasia type 2 (multiple endocrine neoplasia type 2A, pheochromocytoma and amyloid-producing medullary thyroid carcinoma, PTC syndrome, Sipple syndrome)
Multiple endocrine neoplasia type 3 (mucosal neuromata with endocrine tumors, multiple endocrine neoplasia type 2B, multiple mucosal neuroma syndrome, Wagenmann–Froboese syndrome)
Myxedema
Panhypopituitarism
Persistent adrenarche syndrome (adrenal SAHA syndrome)
Polycystic ovarian syndrome
Seborrhoea–acne–hirsutism–alopecia (SAHA syndrome)
Thyroid acropachy

Eosinophilic 

Eosinophilic cutaneous conditions encompass a wide variety of diseases that are characterized histologically by the presence of eosinophils in the inflammatory infiltrate, or evidence of eosinophil degranulation.

Angiolymphoid hyperplasia with eosinophilia (epithelioid hemangioma, histiocytoid hemangioma, inflammatory angiomatous nodule, inflammatory arteriovenous hemangioma, intravenous atypical vascular proliferation, papular angioplasia, pseudopyogenic granuloma)
Annular erythema of infancy
Arthropod assault
Eosinophilic cellulitis (Wells' syndrome)
Eosinophilic fasciitis (Shulman's syndrome)
Eosinophilic granuloma
Eosinophilic granulomatosis with polyangiitis 
Eosinophilic pustular folliculitis of infancy (eosinophilic pustular folliculitis in infancy, infantile eosinophilic pustular folliculitis, neonatal eosinophilic pustular folliculitis)
Eosinophilic ulcer of the oral mucosa (eosinophilic ulcer of the tongue, Riga–Fede disease, traumatic eosinophilic granuloma) 
Eosinophilic vasculitis
Erythema toxicum neonatorum (erythema toxicum, toxic erythema of the newborn)
Granuloma faciale
Hypereosinophilia
Hypereosinophilic syndrome
Incontinentia pigmenti (Bloch–Siemens syndrome, Bloch–Sulzberger disease, Bloch–Sulzberger syndrome)
Itchy red bump disease (papular dermatitis)
Juvenile xanthogranuloma
Kimura's disease
Nodules–eosinophilia–rheumatism–dermatitis–swelling syndrome 
Pachydermatous eosinophilic dermatitis
Papular eruption of blacks
Papuloerythroderma of Ofuji
Pruritic papular eruption of HIV disease

Epidermal nevi, neoplasms, and cysts 

Epidermal nevi, neoplasms, and cysts are skin lesions that develop from the epidermal layer of the skin.

Aberrant basal cell carcinoma
Acanthoma fissuratum (granuloma fissuratum, spectacle frame acanthoma)
Acrospiroma (clear cell hidradenoma, dermal duct tumor, hidroacanthoma simplex, nodular hidradenoma, poroma)
Actinic keratosis (senile keratosis, solar keratosis)
Adenoid squamous cell carcinoma (pseudoglandular squamous cell carcinoma)
Aggressive digital papillary adenocarcinoma (digital papillary adenocarcinoma, papillary adenoma) 
Apocrine gland carcinoma
Apocrine nevus
Arsenical keratosis
Atrophic actinic keratosis
Balanitis plasmacellularis (balanoposthitis chronica circumscripta plasmacellularis, balanitis circumscripta plasmacellularis, plasma cell balanitis, plasma cell vulvitis, vulvitis circumscripta plasmacellularis, Zoon's balanitis, Zoon's erythroplasia, Zoon's vulvitis)
Basal cell carcinoma
Basaloid follicular hamartoma
Basaloid squamous cell carcinoma
Birt–Hogg–Dubé syndrome
Bowen's disease (squamous cell carcinoma in situ)
Brooke–Fordyce syndrome
Ceruminoma
Cicatricial basal cell carcinoma (morpheaform basal cell carcinoma, morphoeic basal cell carcinoma)
Ciliated cyst of the vulva (cutaneous Müllerian cyst, paramesonephric mucinous cyst of the vulva)
Clear cell acanthoma (acanthome cellules claires of Degos and Civatte, Degos acanthoma, pale cell acanthoma)
Clear cell squamous cell carcinoma (clear cell carcinoma of the skin)
Chronic scar keratosis (chronic cicatrix keratosis)
Clonal seborrheic keratosis
Common seborrheic keratosis (basal cell papilloma, solid seborrheic keratosis)
Cowden syndrome (Cowden's disease, multiple hamartoma syndrome)
Cutaneous ciliated cyst
Cutaneous columnar cyst
Cutaneous horn (Cornu cutaneum)
Cystic basal cell carcinoma
Dermal eccrine cylindroma (cylindroma)
Dermatosis papulosa nigra
Desmoplastic trichoepithelioma
Dilated pore (dilated pore of Winer) 
Eccrine carcinoma (syringoid carcinoma)
Eccrine nevus
Epidermal cyst (epidermal inclusion cyst, epidermoid cyst, infundibular cyst, keratin cyst)
Epidermal nevus syndrome (Feuerstein and Mims syndrome, Solomon's syndrome)
Epidermolytic acanthoma
Epithelioma cuniculatum (Ackerman tumor, carcinoma cuniculatum)
Eruptive vellus hair cyst
Erythroplasia of Queyrat
Extramammary Paget's disease
Fibroepithelioma
Fibroepithelioma of Pinkus
Fibrofolliculoma
Follicular hybrid cyst (Hybrid cyst)
Folliculosebaceous-apocrine hamartoma (follicular-apocrine hamartoma)
Folliculosebaceous cystic hamartoma
Generalized eruptive keratoacanthoma (generalized eruptive keratoacanthoma of Grzybowski)
Giant solitary trichoepithelioma
Hidradenoma 
Hidradenocarcinoma
Hidrocystoma (cystadenoma, Moll's gland cyst, sudoriferous cyst)
Hydrocarbon keratosis (pitch keratosis, tar keratosis, tar wart)
Hyperkeratosis lenticularis perstans (Flegel's disease)
Hyperkeratosis of the nipple and areola
Hyperkeratotic actinic keratosis
Ichthyosis hystrix (ichthyosis hystrix gravior type Lambert, porcupine man, systematized verrucous nevus)
Ichthyosis hystrix of Curth–Macklin
Infiltrative basal cell carcinoma
Inflammatory linear verrucous epidermal nevus
Inverted follicular keratosis
Irritated seborrheic keratosis (basosquamous cell acanthoma, inflamed seborrheic keratosis)
Isthmicoma (infundibuloma, tumor of the follicular infundibulum)
Juvenile myelomonocytic leukemia
Keratin implantation cyst
Keratoacanthoma
Keratoacanthoma centrifugum marginatum
Large cell acanthoma
Lichenoid actinic keratosis
Lichenoid keratosis (benign lichenoid keratosis, lichen planus-like keratosis, solitary lichen planus, solitary lichenoid keratosis)
Linear verrucous epidermal nevus (linear epidermal nevus, verrucous epidermal nevus)
Malignant acrospiroma (spiradenocarcinoma)
Malignant mixed tumor (malignant chondroid syringoma)
Malignant trichilemmal cyst
Mantleoma
Marjolin's ulcer
Melanoacanthoma (pigmented seborrheic keratosis)
Merkel cell carcinoma (cutaneous apudoma, primary neuroendocrine carcinoma of the skin, primary small cell carcinoma of the skin, trabecular carcinoma of the skin)
Microcystic adnexal carcinoma (sclerosing sweat duct carcinoma)
Micronodular basal cell carcinoma
Milia en plaque
Milium 
Mixed tumor (chondroid syringoma)
Mucinous carcinoma
Mucinous nevus (nevus mucinosus)
Muir–Torre syndrome
Multiple familial trichoepithelioma (Brooke–Spiegler syndrome, epithelioma adenoides cysticum)
Multiple keratoacanthomas (Ferguson–Smith syndrome, Ferguson-Smith type of multiple self-healing keratoacanthomas, multiple keratoacanthomas of the Ferguson–Smith type)
Multiple minute digitate hyperkeratosis (digitate keratoses, disseminated spiked hyperkeratosis, familial disseminated piliform hyperkeratosis, minute aggregate keratosis)
Nevoid basal cell carcinoma syndrome (basal cell nevus syndrome, Gorlin syndrome, Gorlin–Goltz syndrome)
Nevus comedonicus (comedo nevus)
Nevus comedonicus syndrome
Nevus sebaceous (nevus sebaceous of Jadassohn, organoid nevus)
Nevus unius lateris
Nodular basal cell carcinoma (classic basal cell carcinoma)
Paget's disease of the breast
Papillary eccrine adenoma (tubular apocrine adenoma)
Papillary hidradenoma (hidradenoma papilliferum)
Papillomatosis cutis carcinoides (Gottron's carcinoid papillomatosis, papillomatosis cutis carcinoides of Gottron–Eisenlohr)
Patch blue nevus (acquired dermal melanocytosis, dermal melanocyte hamartoma)
Perifollicular fibroma
Phakomatosis pigmentokeratotica
Pigmented actinic keratosis
Pigmented basal cell carcinoma
Pigmented hairy epidermal nevus syndrome
Pilar sheath acanthoma
Pilonidal sinus (Barber's interdigital pilonidal sinus, pilonidal cyst, pilonidal disease)
Porocarcinoma (malignant poroma, eccrine porocarcinoma)
Polypoid basal cell carcinoma
Pore-like basal cell carcinoma
Primary cutaneous adenoid cystic carcinoma
Proliferating epidermoid cyst (proliferating epithelial cyst)
Proliferating trichilemmal cyst (pilar tumor, proliferating follicular cystic neoplasm, proliferating pilar tumor, proliferating trichilemmal tumor)
Pseudocyst of the auricle (auricular endochondrial pseudocyst, cystic chondromalacia, endochondral pseudocyst, intracartilaginous cyst)
Pseudoepitheliomatous keratotic and micaceous balanitis
PUVA keratosis
Rasmussen syndrome
Reactional keratosis
Reticulated seborrheic keratosis (adenoid seborrheic keratosis)
Rodent ulcer (Jacobi ulcer)
Schimmelpenning syndrome (Schimmelpenning–Feuerstein–Mims syndrome)
Sebaceoma (sebaceous epithelioma)
Sebaceous adenoma
Sebaceous carcinoma
Sebaceous hyperplasia
Sebaceous nevus syndrome
Seboacanthoma
Seborrheic keratosis (seborrheic verruca, senile wart)
Seborrheic keratosis with squamous atypia
Signet-ring cell squamous cell carcinoma
Solitary keratoacanthoma (subungual keratoacanthoma)
Solitary trichoepithelioma
Spindle cell squamous cell carcinoma (spindle cell carcinoma)
Spiradenoma
Squamous cell carcinoma 
Steatocystoma multiplex (epidermal polycystic disease, sebocystomatosis)
Steatocystoma simplex (simple sebaceous duct cyst, solitary steatocystoma)
Stucco keratosis (digitate seborrheic keratosis, hyperkeratotic seborrheic keratosis, keratosis alba, serrated seborrheic keratosis, verrucous seborrheic keratosis)
Superficial basal cell carcinoma (superficial multicentric basal cell carcinoma)
Syringadenoma papilliferum (syringocystadenoma papilliferum)
Syringofibroadenoma (acrosyringeal nevus of Weedon and Lewis)
Syringoma
Systematized epidermal nevus
Thermal keratosis
Trichilemmal carcinoma
Trichilemmal cyst (isthmus-catagen cyst, pilar cyst)
Trichilemmoma
Trichoadenoma (trichoadenoma of Nikolowski)
Trichoblastoma
Trichoblastic fibroma
Trichodiscoma
Trichofolliculoma
Unilateral palmoplantar verrucous nevus
Urethral caruncle
Verrucous carcinoma
Verrucous cyst (cystic papilloma)
Viral keratosis
Warty dyskeratoma (isolated dyskeratosis follicularis)
Waxy keratosis of childhood (kerinokeratosis papulosa)
Zoon's vulvitis
Zosteriform speckled lentiginous nevus

Erythemas 

Erythemas are reactive skin conditions in which there is blanchable redness.

Erythema annulare centrifugum (deep gyrate erythema, erythema perstans, palpable migrating erythema, superficial gyrate erythema)
Erythema gyratum repens (Gammel's disease)
Erythema migrans (erythema chronicum migrans)
Erythema multiforme
Erythema multiforme minor (herpes simplex-associated erythema multiforme)
Erythema palmare
Generalized erythema
Necrolytic acral erythema
Necrolytic migratory erythema (glucagonoma syndrome)

Genodermatoses 

Genodermatoses are inherited genetic skin conditions often grouped into three categories: chromosomal, single gene, and polygenetic.

18q deletion syndrome
Acrodermatitis enteropathica
Acrogeria (Gottron syndrome)
Acrokeratosis verruciformis (acrokeratosis verruciformis of Hopf)
Adams–Oliver syndrome
Adducted thumbs syndrome
Albright's hereditary osteodystrophy
Angelman syndrome
Apert syndrome (acrocephalosyndactyly)
Arthrogryposis–renal dysfunction–cholestasis syndrome 
Ataxia telangiectasia (Louis–Bar syndrome)
Atrichia with papular lesions (papular atrichia)
Atrophodermia vermiculata (acne vermoulante, acne vermoulanti, atrophoderma reticulata symmetrica faciei, atrophoderma reticulatum, atrophoderma vermiculata, atrophoderma vermiculatum, atrophodermia reticulata symmetrica faciei, atrophodermia ulerythematosa, atrophodermie vermiculée des joues avec kératoses folliculaires, folliculitis ulerythema reticulata, folliculitis ulerythematous reticulata, folliculitis ulerythemosa, honeycomb atrophy, ulerythema acneforme, ulerythema acneiforme)
Autoimmune polyendocrinopathy–candidiasis–ectodermal dystrophy syndrome 
Bart syndrome
Bazex–Dupré–Christol syndrome (Bazex syndrome, follicular atrophoderma and basal cell carcinomas)
Beare–Stevenson cutis gyrata syndrome
Bloom syndrome (Bloom–Torre–Machacek syndrome)
Blue rubber bleb nevus syndrome
Brittle hair–intellectual impairment–decreased fertility–short stature syndrome 
Cantú syndrome
Cardio-facio-cutaneous syndrome (cardiofaciocutaneous syndrome)
Cartilage–hair hypoplasia (McKusick type metaphyseal chondrodysplasia)
Cerebral dysgenesis–neuropathy–ichthyosis–keratoderma syndrome 
Childhood tumor syndrome
Chondrodysplasia punctata
Cicatricial junctional epidermolysis bullosa
Craniosynostosis–anal anomalies–porokeratosis syndrome 
Cockayne syndrome
Colobomas of the eye–heart defects–ichthyosiform dermatosis–mental retardation–ear defects syndrome (CHIME syndrome, Zunich neuroectodermal syndrome, Zunich–Kaye syndrome)
Congenital hemidysplasia with ichthyosiform erythroderma and limb defects syndrome (CHILD syndrome)
Conradi–Hünermann syndrome (Conradi–Hünermann–Happle syndrome, Happle syndrome, X-linked dominant chondrodysplasia punctata)
Costello syndrome
Cronkhite–Canada syndrome
Crouzon syndrome
Cutis verticis gyrata
Darier's disease (Darier–White disease, dyskeratosis follicularis, keratosis follicularis) 
DeSanctis–Cacchione syndrome
Disseminated superficial actinic porokeratosis
Disseminated superficial porokeratosis
Dolichol kinase deficiency
Dominant dystrophic epidermolysis bullosa
Dyskeratosis congenita (Zinsser–Cole–Engman syndrome)
Dystrophic epidermolysis bullosa
Ectodermal dysplasia
Ectodermal dysplasia with corkscrew hairs
Ectrodactyly–ectodermal dysplasia–cleft syndrome (EEC syndrome, split hand–split foot–ectodermal dysplasia–cleft syndrome)
Epidermolysis bullosa herpetiformis (Dowling–Meara epidermolysis bullosa simplex)
Epidermolysis bullosa simplex
Epidermolysis bullosa simplex of Ogna
Epidermolysis bullosa simplex with mottled pigmentation
Epidermolysis bullosa simplex with muscular dystrophy
Epidermolytic hyperkeratosis (bullous congenital ichthyosiform erythroderma, bullous ichthyosiform erythroderma)
Erythrokeratodermia with ataxia (Giroux–Barbeau syndrome)
Familial benign chronic pemphigus (familial benign pemphigus, Hailey–Hailey disease)
Fanconi syndrome (familial pancytopenia, familial panmyelophthisis)
Fibrodysplasia ossificans progressiva
Focal dermal hypoplasia (Goltz syndrome)
Follicular atrophoderma
Franceschetti–Klein syndrome (mandibulofacial dysostosis)
Gardner's syndrome (familial colorectal polyposis)
Gastrocutaneous syndrome
Generalized atrophic benign epidermolysis bullosa
Generalized epidermolysis bullosa simplex (Koebner variant of generalized epidermolysis bullosa simplex)
Generalized trichoepithelioma
Giant axonal neuropathy with curly hair
Gingival fibromatosis with hypertrichosis
Haber syndrome
Hallerman–Streiff syndrome
Harlequin-type ichthyosis (harlequin baby, harlequin fetus, harlequin ichthyosis, ichthyosis congenita, ichthyosis congenita gravior)
Hay–Wells syndrome (AEC syndrome, ankyloblepharon filiforme adnatum–ectodermal dysplasia–cleft palate syndrome, ankyloblepharon–ectodermal defects–cleft lip and palate syndrome, ankyloblepharon–ectodermal dysplasia–clefting syndrome)
Hereditary sclerosing poikiloderma 
Heterochromia iridum
Holocarboxylase synthetase deficiency
Hypohidrotic ectodermal dysplasia (anhidrotic ectodermal dysplasia, Christ–Siemens–Touraine syndrome)
Hypotrichosis–acro-osteolysis–onychogryphosis–palmoplantar keratoderma–periodontitis syndrome 
Hypotrichosis–lymphedema–telangiectasia syndrome
Ichthyosis–brittle hair–impaired intelligence–decreased fertility–short stature syndrome (IBIDS syndrome, sulfur-deficient brittle hair syndrome, Tay's syndrome, trichothiodystrophy, trichothiodystrophy with ichthyosis)
Ichthyosis bullosa of Siemens (ichthyosis exfoliativa)
Ichthyosis follicularis (ichthyosis follicularis with alopecia and photophobia syndrome)
Ichthyosis linearis circumflexa
Ichthyosis prematurity syndrome
Ichthyosis vulgaris (autosomal dominant ichthyosis, ichthyosis simplex)
Ichthyosis with confetti
Neonatal ichthyosis–sclerosing cholangitis syndrome (ichthyosis–sclerosing cholangitis syndrome, NISCH syndrome)
Incontinentia pigmenti achromians (hypomelanosis of Ito)
Immune dysfunction–polyendocrinopathy–enteropathy–X-linked syndrome 
Jaffe–Campanacci syndrome
Johanson–Blizzard syndrome
Johnson–McMillin syndrome
Joubert syndrome
Junctional epidermolysis bullosa
Junctional epidermolysis bullosa gravis (epidermolysis bullosa letalis, Herlitz disease, Herlitz epidermolysis bullosa, Herlitz syndrome, lethal junctional epidermolysis bullosa)
Junctional epidermolysis bullosa with pyloric atresia
Kabuki syndrome (Kabuki makeup syndrome, Niikawa–Kuroki syndrome)
Keratolytic winter erythema (erythrokeratolysis hiemalis, Oudtshoorn disease, Oudtshoorn skin)
Keratosis follicularis spinulosa decalvans (Siemens-1 syndrome)
Keratosis linearis with ichthyosis congenita and sclerosing keratoderma syndrome 
Keratosis pilaris atrophicans faciei (folliculitis rubra, keratosis pilaris rubra atrophicans faciei, lichen pilare, lichen pilaire ou xerodermie pilaire symmetrique de la face, ulerythema ophryogenes, xerodermi pilaire symmetrique de la face)
Keratosis pilaris
Kindler syndrome (acrokeratotic poikiloderma, bullous acrokeratotic poikiloderma of Kindler and Weary, congenital poikiloderma with blisters and keratoses, congenital poikiloderma with bullae and progressive cutaneous atrophy, hereditary acrokeratotic poikiloderma, hyperkeratosis–hyperpigmentation syndrome, Weary–Kindler syndrome)
Klinefelter syndrome
Klippel–Feil syndrome
Lamellar ichthyosis (collodion baby)
Legius syndrome (neurofibromatosis type 1-like syndrome)
Lelis syndrome
Lenz–Majewski syndrome
Leschke syndrome
Lethal acantholytic epidermolysis bullosa
Lhermitte–Duclos disease
Linear and whorled nevoid hypermelanosis (linear nevoid hyperpigmentation, progressive cribriform and zosteriform hyperpigmentation, reticulate and zosteriform hyperpigmentation, reticulate hyperpigmentation of Iijima and Naito and Uyeno, zebra-like hyperpigmentation in whorls and streaks, zebra-line hyperpigmentation)
Linear Darier disease (acantholytic dyskeratotic epidermal nevus)
Linear porokeratosis
Localized epidermolysis bullosa simplex (Weber–Cockayne syndrome, Weber–Cockayne variant of generalized epidermolysis bullosa simplex)
Mandibuloacral dysplasia
Marinesco–Sjögren syndrome
McCune–Albright syndrome
McCusick syndrome
Metageria
Microphthalmia–dermal aplasia–sclerocornea syndrome 
Mitis junctional epidermolysis bullosa (nonlethal junctional epidermolysis bullosa)
Mitochondrial myopathy–encephalopathy–lactic acidosis–stroke syndrome 
Multiple lentigines syndrome (cardiocutaneous syndrome, Gorlin syndrome II, lentiginosis profusa syndrome, LEOPARD syndrome, progressive cardiomyopathic lentiginosis)
Multiple pterygium syndrome
Multiple sulfatase deficiency (Austin disease, mucosulfatidosis)
Naegeli–Franceschetti–Jadassohn syndrome (chromatophore nevus of Naegeli)
Netherton syndrome
Neurofibromatosis type 1 (von Recklinghausen's disease) 
Neurofibromatosis type 3 (neurofibromatosis mixed type)
Neurofibromatosis type 4 (neurofibromatosis variant type)
Neutral lipid storage disease (Dorfman–Chanarin syndrome)
Nonbullous congenital ichthyosiform erythroderma (congenital ichthyosiform erythroderma)
Noonan syndrome
Oculocerebrocutaneous syndrome (Delleman–Oorthuys syndrome)
Oculodentodigital dysplasia
Odonto–Tricho–Ungual–Digital–Palmar syndrome
Oliver–McFarlane syndrome
Orofaciodigital syndrome
Pachydermoperiostosis (idiopathic hypertrophic osteoathorpathy, Touraine–Solente–Gole syndrome)
Peeling skin syndrome (acral peeling skin syndrome, continual peeling skin syndrome, familial continual skin peeling, idiopathic deciduous skin, keratolysis exfoliativa congenita)
Pfeiffer syndrome
Photosensitivity–ichthyosis–brittle sulfur-deficient hair–impaired intelligence–decreased fertility–short stature syndrome 
Pityriasis rotunda (pityriasis circinata, tinea circinata)
Plate-like osteoma cutis
Plaque-type porokeratosis (classic porokeratosis, porokeratosis of Mibelli)
Polyneuropathy–organomegaly–endocrinopathy–monoclonal gammopathy–skin changes syndrome (Crow–Fukase syndrome)
Polyostotic fibrous dysplasia (Albright's disease)
Popliteal pterygium syndrome
Porokeratosis
Porokeratosis palmaris et plantaris disseminata
Prader–Willi syndrome
Progeria (Hutchinson–Gilford progeria syndrome, Hutchinson–Gilford syndrome, progeria syndrome)
Progressive osseous heteroplasia
Progressive symmetric erythrokeratodermia (erythrokeratodermia progressiva symmetrica)
Proteus syndrome
Proteus-like syndrome
Punctate porokeratosis
Rapp–Hodgkin syndrome (Rapp–Hodgkin ectodermal dysplasia syndrome)
Recessive dystrophic epidermolysis bullosa (Hallopeau–Siemens variant of epidermolysis bullosa, Hallopeau–Siemens disease)
Refsum's disease (heredopathia atactica polyneuritiformis, phytanic acid storage disease)
Relapsing linear acantholytic dermatosis
Restrictive dermopathy 
Rhizomelic chondrodysplasia punctata (autosomal recessive chondrodysplasia punctata type 1, chondrodystrophia calcificans punctata, peroxisomal biogenesis disorder complementation group 11)
Rombo syndrome
Rothmund–Thomson syndrome (poikiloderma congenitale)
Rud syndrome
Say syndrome
Scalp–ear–nipple syndrome (Finlay–Marks syndrome)
Schindler disease (Kanzaki disease, alpha-N-acetylgalactosaminidase deficiency)
Schinzel–Giedion syndrome
Scleroatrophic syndrome of Huriez (Huriez syndrome, palmoplantar keratoderma with scleroatrophy, palmoplantar keratoderma with sclerodactyly, scleroatrophic and keratotic dermatosis of the limbs, sclerotylosis)
Segmental neurofibromatosis
Senter syndrome (Desmons' syndrome)
Shabbir syndrome (laryngo–onycho–cutaneous syndrome)
Silver–Russell syndrome
Sjögren–Larsson syndrome
Skin fragility syndrome (plakophilin 1 deficiency)
Smith–Lemli–Opitz syndrome
Sturge–Weber syndrome
Supernumerary nipples–uropathies–Becker's nevus syndrome 
Terminal osseous dysplasia with pigmentary defects
Tooth and nail syndrome (hypodontia with nail dysgenesis, Witkop syndrome)
Townes–Brocks syndrome
Transient bullous dermolysis of the newborn 
Treacher Collins syndrome (Treacher Collins–Franceschetti syndrome)
Tricho–dento–osseous syndrome
Tricho–rhino–phalangeal syndrome
Tuberous sclerosis (Bourneville disease, epiloia)
Turner syndrome
Ulnar–mammary syndrome
Van Der Woude syndrome
Von Hippel–Lindau syndrome
Watson syndrome
Werner syndrome (adult progeria)
Westerhof syndrome
Whistling syndrome (craniocarpotarsal syndrome, distal arthrogryposis type 2, Freeman–Sheldon syndrome, Windmill–Vane–Hand syndrome)
Wilson–Turner syndrome
Wolf–Hirschhorn syndrome (4p- syndrome)
X-linked ichthyosis (steroid sulfatase deficiency, X-linked recessive ichthyosis)
X-linked recessive chondrodysplasia punctata
Xeroderma pigmentosum (Cockayne syndrome complex)
XXYY genotype
Zimmermann–Laband syndrome

Infection-related 

Infection-related cutaneous conditions may be caused by bacteria, fungi, yeast, viruses, or parasites.

Bacterium-related 

Bacterium-related cutaneous conditions often have distinct morphologic characteristics that may be an indication of a generalized systemic process or simply an isolated superficial infection.

Aeromonas infection
African tick bite fever
American tick bite fever (Rickettsia parkeri infection)
Arcanobacterium haemolyticum infection
Bacillary angiomatosis
Bejel (endemic syphilis)
Blastomycosis-like pyoderma (pyoderma vegetans)
Blistering distal dactylitis
Botryomycosis
Brill–Zinsser disease
Brucellosis (Bang's disease, Malta fever, undulant fever)
Bubonic plague
Bullous impetigo
Cat scratch disease (cat scratch fever, English–Wear infection, inoculation lymphoreticulosis, subacute regional lymphadenitis)
Cellulitis 
Chancre
Chancroid (soft chancre, ulcus molle)
Chlamydial infection
Chronic lymphangitis
Chronic recurrent erysipelas
Chronic undermining burrowing ulcers (Meleney gangrene)
Chromobacteriosis infection
Condylomata lata
Cutaneous actinomycosis
Cutaneous anthrax infection
Cutaneous C. diphtheriae infection (Barcoo rot, diphtheric desert sore, septic sore, Veldt sore)
Cutaneous group B streptococcal infection
Cutaneous Pasteurella hemolytica infection
Cutaneous Streptococcus iniae infection
Dermatitis gangrenosa (gangrene of the skin)
Ecthyma
Ecthyma gangrenosum
Ehrlichiosis ewingii infection
Elephantiasis nostras
Endemic typhus (murine typhus)
Epidemic typhus (epidemic louse-borne typhus)
Erysipelas (ignis sacer, Saint Anthony's fire)
Erysipeloid of Rosenbach
Erythema marginatum
Erythrasma
External otitis (otitis externa, swimmer's ear) 
Felon
Flea-borne spotted fever
Flinders Island spotted fever
Flying squirrel typhus
Folliculitis
Fournier gangrene (Fournier gangrene of the penis or scrotum)
Furunculosis (boil)
Gas gangrene (clostridial myonecrosis, myonecrosis)
Glanders (equinia, farcy, malleus)
Gonococcemia (arthritis–dermatosis syndrome, disseminated gonococcal infection)
Gonorrhea (clap)
Gram-negative folliculitis
Gram-negative toe web infection
Granuloma inguinale (Donovanosis, granuloma genitoinguinale, granuloma inguinale tropicum, granuloma venereum, granuloma venereum genitoinguinale, lupoid form of groin ulceration, serpiginous ulceration of the groin, ulcerating granuloma of the pudendum, ulcerating sclerosing granuloma)
Green nail syndrome
Group JK Corynebacterium sepsis
Haemophilus influenzae cellulitis
Helicobacter cellulitis
Hospital furunculosis
Hot tub folliculitis (Pseudomonas aeruginosa folliculitis)
Human granulocytotropic anaplasmosis
Human monocytotropic ehrlichiosis
Impetigo contagiosa
Japanese spotted fever
Leptospirosis (Fort Bragg fever, pretibial fever, Weil's disease)
Listeriosis
Ludwig's angina
Lupoid sycosis
Lyme disease (Afzelius' disease, Lyme borreliosis)
Lymphogranuloma venereum (climatic bubo, Durand–Nicolas–Favre disease, lymphogranuloma inguinale, poradenitis inguinale, strumous bubo)
Malakoplakia (malacoplakia)
Mediterranean spotted fever (Boutonneuse fever)
Melioidosis (Whitmore's disease)
Meningococcemia
Missouri Lyme disease
Mycoplasma infection
Necrotizing fasciitis (flesh-eating bacteria syndrome)
Neonatal toxic shock-like exanthematous disease
Nocardiosis
Noma neonatorum
North Asian tick typhus
Ophthalmia neonatorum 
Oroya fever (Carrion's disease)
Pasteurellosis
Perianal cellulitis (perineal dermatitis, streptococcal perianal disease)
Periapical abscess
Pinta
Pitted keratolysis (keratolysis plantare sulcatum, keratoma plantare sulcatum, ringed keratolysis)
Plague
Primary gonococcal dermatitis
Pseudomonal pyoderma
Pseudomonas hot-foot syndrome
Pyogenic paronychia
Pyomyositis
Q fever
Queensland tick typhus
Rat-bite fever
Recurrent toxin-mediated perineal erythema
Rhinoscleroma
Rickettsia aeschlimannii infection
Rickettsialpox
Rocky Mountain spotted fever
Saber shin (anterior tibial bowing)
Saddle nose
Salmonellosis
Scarlet fever
Scrub typhus (Tsutsugamushi fever)
Shigellosis
Staphylococcal scalded skin syndrome (pemphigus neonatorum, Ritter's disease)
Streptococcal intertrigo
Superficial pustular folliculitis (impetigo of Bockhart, superficial folliculitis)
Sycosis vulgaris (barber's itch, sycosis barbae)
Syphilid
Syphilis (lues)
Tick-borne lymphadenopathy
Toxic shock syndrome (streptococcal toxic shock syndrome, streptococcal toxic shock-like syndrome, toxic streptococcal syndrome)
Trench fever (five-day fever, quintan fever, urban trench fever)
Tropical ulcer (Aden ulcer, jungle rot, Malabar ulcer, tropical phagedena)
Tularemia (deer fly fever, Ohara's disease, Pahvant Valley plague, rabbit fever)
Verruga peruana
Vibrio vulnificus infection
Yaws (bouba, frambösie, parangi, pian)

Mycobacterium-related 

Mycobacterium-related cutaneous conditions are caused by Mycobacterium infections.

Aquarium granuloma (fish-tank granuloma, swimming-pool granuloma)
Borderline lepromatous leprosy
Borderline leprosy
Borderline tuberculoid leprosy
Buruli ulcer (Bairnsdale ulcer, Searl ulcer, Searle's ulcer) 
Erythema induratum (Bazin disease)
Histoid leprosy
Lepromatous leprosy
Leprosy (Hansen's disease)
Lichen scrofulosorum (tuberculosis cutis lichenoides)
Lupus vulgaris (tuberculosis luposa)
Miliary tuberculosis (disseminated tuberculosis, tuberculosis cutis acuta generalisata, tuberculosis cutis disseminata)
Mycobacterium avium-intracellulare complex infection
Mycobacterium haemophilum infection
Mycobacterium kansasii infection
Papulonecrotic tuberculid
Primary inoculation tuberculosis (cutaneous primary complex, primary tuberculous complex, tuberculous chancre)
Rapid-growing Mycobacterium infection
Scrofuloderma (tuberculosis cutis colliquativa)
Tuberculosis cutis orificialis (acute tuberculous ulcer, orificial tuberculosis)
Tuberculosis verrucosa cutis (lupus verrucosus, prosector's wart, warty tuberculosis)
Tuberculous cellulitis
Tuberculous gumma (metastatic tuberculous abscess, metastatic tuberculous ulcer)
Tuberculoid leprosy

Mycosis-related 

Mycosis-related cutaneous conditions are caused by fungi or yeasts, and may present as either a superficial or deep infection of the skin, hair, or nails.

African histoplasmosis
Alternariosis
Antibiotic candidiasis (iatrogenic candidiasis)
Black piedra
Candidal intertrigo
Candidal onychomycosis
Candidal paronychia
Candidal vulvovaginitis
Candidid
Chromoblastomycosis (chromomycosis, cladosporiosis, Fonseca's disease, Pedroso's disease, phaeosporotrichosis, verrucous dermatitis)
Chronic mucocutaneous candidiasis
Coccidioidomycosis (California disease, desert rheumatism, San Joaquin Valley fever, valley fever)
Congenital cutaneous candidiasis
Cryptococcosis
Dermatophytid
Diaper candidiasis
Disseminated coccidioidomycosis (coccidioidal granuloma)
Distal subungual onychomycosis
Entomophthoromycosis
Erosio interdigitalis blastomycetica 
Favus
Fungal folliculitis (majocchi granuloma)
Fusariosis
Geotrichosis
Granuloma gluteale infantum
Histoplasmosis (cave disease, Darling's disease, Ohio Valley disease, reticuloendotheliosis)
Hyalohyphomycosis
Kerion
Lobomycosis (keloidal blastomycosis, lacaziosis, Lobo's disease)
Mucormycosis
Mycetoma (Madura foot, maduromycosis)
North American blastomycosis (blastomycetic dermatitis, blastomycosis, Gilchrist's disease)
Onychomycosis (dermatophytic onychomycosis, ringworm of the nail, tinea unguium)
Oral candidiasis (thrush)
Otomycosis
Perianal candidiasis
Perlèche (angular cheilitis)
Phaeohyphomycosis
Piedra (trichosporosis)
Pityrosporum folliculitis
Primary cutaneous aspergillosis
Primary cutaneous coccidioidomycosis
Primary cutaneous histoplasmosis
Primary pulmonary coccidioidomycosis
Primary pulmonary histoplasmosis
Progressive disseminated histoplasmosis
Proximal subungual onychomycosis
Rhinosporidiosis
South American blastomycosis (Brazilian blastomycosis, paracoccidioidal granuloma, paracoccidioidomycosis)
Sporotrichosis (rose-gardener's disease)
Systemic candidiasis
Tinea barbae (barber's itch, ringworm of the beard, tinea sycosis) 
Tinea capitis (herpes tonsurans, ringworm of the hair, ringworm of the scalp, scalp ringworm, tinea tonsurans)
Tinea corporis (ringworm, tinea circinata, tinea glabrosa)
Tinea corporis gladiatorum
Tinea cruris (crotch itch, eczema marginatum, gym itch, jock itch, ringworm of the groin)
Tinea faciei
Tinea imbricata (tokelau)
Tinea incognito
Tinea manuum
Tinea nigra (superficial phaeohyphomycosis, tinea nigra palmaris et plantaris)
Tinea pedis (athlete's foot, ringworm of the foot)
Tinea versicolor (dermatomycosis furfuracea, pityriasis versicolor, tinea flava)
White piedra
White superficial onychomycosis
Zygomycosis (phycomycosis)

Parasitic infestations, stings, and bites 

Parasitic infestations, stings, and bites in humans are caused by several groups of organisms belonging to the following phyla: Annelida, Arthropoda, Bryozoa, Chordata, Cnidaria, Cyanobacteria, Echinodermata, Nemathelminthes, Platyhelminthes, and Protozoa.

Acanthamoeba infection
Amebiasis cutis
Ant sting
Arachnidism
Baker's itch
Balamuthia infection
Bedbug infestation (bedbug bite, cimicosis)
Bee and wasp stings
Blister beetle dermatitis
Bombardier beetle burn
Bristleworm sting 
Centipede bite
Cheyletiella dermatitis
Chigger bite
Coolie itch
Copra itch
Coral dermatitis
Creeping eruption (cutaneous larva migrans)
Cutaneous leishmaniasis (Aleppo boil, Baghdad boil, bay sore, Biskra button, Chiclero ulcer, Delhi boil, Kandahar sore, Lahore sore, leishmaniasis tropica, oriental sore, pian bois, uta)
Cysticercosis cutis
Demodex folliculitis, usually caused by the Demodex folliculorum mite
Dogger Bank itch
Dracunculiasis (dracontiasis, guinea worm disease, Medina worm)
Echinococcosis (hydatid disease)
Elephantiasis tropica (elephantiasis arabum)
Elephant skin
Enterobiasis (oxyuriasis, pinworm infection, seatworm infection)
Erisipela de la costa
Feather pillow dermatitis
Funnel web spider bite
Gamasoidosis
Gnathostomiasis (larva migrans profundus)
Grain itch (barley itch, mattress itch, prairie itch, straw itch)
Grocer's itch
Head lice infestation (cooties, pediculosis capitis)
Hookworm disease (ancylostomiasis, ground itch, necatoriasis, uncinariasis)
Human trypanosomiasis
Hydroid dermatitis
Irukandji syndrome
Jellyfish dermatitis
Ked itch
Larva currens
Latrodectism (widow spider bite)
Leech bite
Leopard skin
Lepidopterism (Caripito itch, caterpillar dermatitis, moth dermatitis)
Lizard skin
Loaiasis (Calabar swelling, fugitive swelling, loa loa, tropical swelling)
Loxoscelism (brown recluse spider bite, necrotic cutaneous loxoscelism)
Mal morando
Millipede burn
Mosquito bite
Mucocutaneous leishmaniasis (espundia, leishmaniasis americana)
Myiasis
Nairobi fly dermatitis (Kenya fly dermatitis, Nairobi eye)
Nematode dermatitis
Norwegian scabies (crusted scabies) 
Onchocerciasis
Ophthalmia nodosa
Paederus dermatitis
Pediculosis corporis (pediculosis vestimenti, Vagabond's disease)
Pediculosis pubis (crabs, phthirus pubis, phthirus pubis, pubic lice)
Pneumocystosis (often classified as fungal)
Portuguese man-of-war dermatitis
Post-kala-azar dermal leishmaniasis (post-kala-azar dermatosis)
Protothecosis
Pulicosis (flea bites)
Reduviid bite
Scabies (itch mite infestation, seven-year itch)
Scorpion sting
Sea anemone dermatitis
Seabather's eruption (sea lice)
Sea urchin injury
Seaweed dermatitis
Snake bite
Sowda
Sparganosis
Spider bite
Stingray injury
Swimmer's itch (cercarial dermatitis, schistosome cercarial dermatitis) 
Tarantula bite
Tick bite
Toxoplasmosis
Trichinosis
Trichomoniasis
Tungiasis (bicho de pie, chigoe flea bite, jigger bite, nigua, pique)
Visceral leishmaniasis (dumdum fever, kala-azar)
Visceral schistosomiasis (bilharziasis)
Viscerotropic leishmaniasis
Wheat warehouse itch

Virus-related 

Virus-related cutaneous conditions are caused by two main groups of viruses–DNA and RNA types–both of which are obligatory intracellular parasites.

Alphavirus infection
Asymmetric periflexural exanthem of childhood (unilateral laterothoracic exanthem)
B virus infection
Boston exanthem disease
Bovine papular stomatitis
Bowenoid papulosis
Buffalopox
Butcher's wart
Chikungunya fever
Condylomata acuminata
Congenital rubella syndrome
Cowpox
Cytomegalic inclusion disease
Dengue (Break-bone fever)
Disseminated herpes zoster
Eczema herpeticum (Kaposi's varicelliform eruption) 
Eczema vaccinatum
Epidermodysplasia verruciformis
Eruptive pseudoangiomatosis
Erythema infectiosum (fifth disease, slapped cheek disease)
Exanthem of primary HIV infection (acute retroviral syndrome)
Farmyard pox
Generalized vaccinia
Genital herpes (herpes genitalis, herpes progenitalis)
Gianotti–Crosti syndrome (infantile papular acrodermatitis, papular acrodermatitis of childhood, papulovesicular acrolocated syndrome)
Giant condyloma acuminatum (Buschke–Löwenstein tumor, giant condyloma of Buschke–Löwenstein tumor)
Hand-foot-and-mouth disease
Heck's disease (focal epithelial hyperplasia)
Hemorrhagic fever with renal syndrome
Hepatitis B
Hepatitis C
Herpangina
Herpes gladiatorum (scrum pox)
Herpes simplex
Herpes zoster oticus (Ramsay–Hunt syndrome)
Herpetic keratoconjunctivitis
Herpetic sycosis
Herpetic whitlow
HIV-associated pruritus
Human monkeypox
Human T-lymphotropic virus 1 infection
Human tanapox
Immune reconstitution inflammatory syndrome (immune recovery syndrome)
Infectious mononucleosis (glandular fever)
Inflammatory skin lesions following zoster infection (isotopic response)
Intrauterine herpes simplex 
Kaposi sarcoma
Lassa fever
Lipschütz ulcer (ulcus vulvae acutum)
Measles (rubeola, morbilli)
Milker's nodule
Modified varicella-like syndrome
Molluscum contagiosum
Myrmecia
Neonatal herpes simplex
Ophthalmic zoster
Orf (contagious pustular dermatosis, ecthyma contagiosum, infectious labial dermatitis, sheep pox)
Orf-induced immunobullous disease
Orolabial herpes (herpes labialis)
Papular purpuric gloves and socks syndrome
Pigmented wart
Postherpetic neuralgia (zoster-associated pain)
Post-vaccination follicular eruption
Progressive vaccinia (vaccinia gangrenosum, vaccinia necrosum)
Pseudocowpox
Recurrent respiratory papillomatosis (laryngeal papillomatosis) 
Rift Valley fever
Roseola infantum (exanthem subitum, exanthema subitum, sixth disease)
Roseola vaccinia
Rubella (German measles)
Sandfly fever (Pappataci fever, phlebotomus fever)
Sealpox
Varicella (chickenpox)
Variola major (smallpox)
Verruca plana (flat wart)
Verruca plantaris (plantar wart)
Verruca vulgaris (wart)
Verrucae palmares et plantares
Viral-associated trichodysplasia (ciclosporin-induced folliculodystrophy)
Wasting syndrome
West Nile virus infection
Zoster (herpes zoster, shingles)
Zoster sine herpete

Lichenoid eruptions 

Lichenoid eruptions are dermatoses related to the unique, common inflammatory disorder lichen planus, which affects the skin, mucous membranes, nails, and hair.

Annular lichen planus 
Atrophic lichen planus
Bullous lichen planus (vesiculobullous lichen planus)
Erosive lichen planus
Erythema dyschromicum perstans (ashy dermatosis, dermatosis cinecienta)
Giant cell lichenoid dermatitis
Hepatitis-associated lichen planus
Hypertrophic lichen planus (lichen planus verrucosus)
Idiopathic eruptive macular pigmentation
Inverse lichen planus
Keratosis lichenoides chronica (Nékam's disease)
Kraurosis vulvae
Lichen nitidus
Lichen planus actinicus (actinic lichen niditus, actinic lichen planus, lichen planus atrophicus annularis, lichen planus subtropicus, lichen planus tropicus, lichenoid melanodermatitis, lichenoid melanodermatosis, summertime actinic lichenoid eruption)
Lichen planus pemphigoides
Lichen planus pigmentosus
Lichen planus–lichen sclerosus overlap syndrome
Lichen ruber moniliformis
Lichen sclerosus (lichen sclerosus et atrophicus)
Lichen striatus (Blaschko linear acquired inflammatory skin eruption, linear lichenoid dermatosis)
Lichen verrucosus et reticularis
Lichenoid trikeratosis
Lichenoid dermatitis
Lichenoid reaction of graft-versus-host disease
Linear lichen planus
Mucosal lichen planus
Peno-gingival syndrome
Ulcerative lichen planus
Vulvovaginal gingival syndrome
Vulvovaginal lichen planus

Lymphoid-related 

Lymphoid-related cutaneous conditions are a group of disorders characterized by collections of lymphocyte cells within the skin.

Adult T-cell leukemia/lymphoma
Angiocentric lymphoma (extranodal natural killer cell lymphoma, nasal-type NK lymphoma, NK/T-cell lymphoma, polymorphic/malignant midline reticulosis)
Angioimmunoblastic T-cell lymphoma (angioimmunoblastic lymphadenopathy with dysproteinemia)
Blastic NK-cell lymphoma
CD30+ cutaneous T-cell lymphoma (primary cutaneous anaplastic large cell lymphoma)
Cutaneous lymphoid hyperplasia (borrelial lymphocytoma, lymphadenosis benigna cutis, lymphocytoma cutis, pseudolymphoma, pseudolymphoma of Spiegler and Fendt, sarcoidosis of Spiegler and Fendt, Spiegler–Fendt lymphoid hyperplasia, Spiegler–Fendt sarcoid) 
Cutaneous lymphoid hyperplasia with bandlike and perivascular patterns
Cutaneous lymphoid hyperplasia with nodular pattern (nodular pattern of cutaneous lymphoid hyperplasia)
Diffuse large B-cell lymphoma (primary cutaneous large B-cell lymphoma)
Granulocytic sarcoma (chloroma, myeloid sarcoma)
Granulomatous slack skin
Hairy-cell leukemia
Hodgkin's disease
Ichthyosis acquisita (acquired ichthyosis)
IgG4-related skin disease
Intravascular large B-cell lymphoma (angiotropic large cell lymphoma, intralymphatic lymphomatosis, intravascular lymphomatosis, malignant angioendotheliomatosis)
Jessner lymphocytic infiltrate of the skin (benign lymphocytic infiltration of the skin, Jessner lymphocytic infiltration of the skin, Jessner–Kanof lymphocytic infiltration of the skin, lymphocytic infiltrate of Jessner)
Kikuchi's disease (histiocytic necrotizing lymphadenitis)
Large plaque parapsoriasis (parapsoriasis en plaques)
Lennert lymphoma (lymphoepitheliod lymphoma)
Leukemia cutis
Lymphoma cutis
Lymphomatoid granulomatosis
Lymphomatoid papulosis
Malignant histiocytosis (histiocytic medullary reticulosis)
Marginal zone B-cell lymphoma
Mucosa-associated lymphoid tissue lymphoma
Mycosis fungoides
Non-mycosis fungoides CD30− cutaneous large T-cell lymphoma
Nonspecific cutaneous conditions associated with leukemia (leukemid)
Pagetoid reticulosis (acral mycoses fungoides, localized epidermotropic reticulosis, mycosis fungoides palmaris et plantaris, unilesional mycosis fungoides, Woringer–Kolopp disease)
Pityriasis lichenoides chronica (chronic guttate parapsoriasis, chronic pityriasis lichenoides, dermatitis psoriasiformis nodularis, parapsoriasis chronica, parapsoriasis lichenoides chronica)
Pityriasis lichenoides et varioliformis acuta (acute guttate parapsoriasis, acute parapsoriasis, acute pityriasis lichenoides, Mucha–Habermann disease, parapsoriasis acuta, parapsoriasis lichenoides et varioliformis acuta, parapsoriasis varioliformis)
Plasmacytoma 
Plasmacytosis
Pleomorphic T-cell lymphoma (non-mycosis fungoides CD30− pleomorphic small/medium-sized cutaneous T-cell lymphoma)
Polycythemia vera (erythremia)
Primary cutaneous follicular lymphoma (follicular center cell lymphoma, follicular center lymphoma)
Primary cutaneous immunocytoma
Primary cutaneous marginal zone lymphoma
Retiform parapsoriasis
Secondary cutaneous CD30+ large cell lymphoma
Sézary syndrome
Sinus histiocytosis with massive lymphadenopathy (Rosai–Dorfman disease)
Subcutaneous T-cell lymphoma (panniculitis-like T-cell lymphoma)
Vesiculopustular eruption and leukemoid reaction in Down syndrome

Melanocytic nevi and neoplasms 

Melanocytic nevi and neoplasms are caused by either a proliferation of (1) melanocytes, or (2) nevus cells, a form of melanocyte that lack dendritic processes.

Acral nevus (melanocytic nevus of acral skin, melanocytic nevus with intraepidermal ascent of cells)
Amelanotic blue nevus (hypomelanotic blue nevus) 
Balloon cell nevus
Bannayan–Riley–Ruvalcaba syndrome
Becker's nevus (Becker's melanosis, Becker's pigmentary hamartoma, nevoid melanosis, pigmented hairy epidermal nevus)
Benign melanocytic nevus (banal nevus, common acquired melanocytic nevus, mole, nevocellular nevus, nevocytic nevus)
Blue nevus (blue neuronevus, dermal melanocytoma, nevus bleu)
Blue nevus of Jadassohn–Tièche (common blue nevus, nevus ceruleus)
Carney complex (LAMB syndrome, NAME syndrome)
Cellular blue nevus
Centrofacial lentiginosis
Congenital melanocytic nevus
Deep penetrating nevus
Dysplastic nevus (atypical mole, atypical nevus, B-K mole, Clark's nevus, dysplastic melanocytic nevus, nevus with architectural disorder)
Dysplastic nevus syndrome (B-K mole syndrome, familial atypical multiple mole–melanoma syndrome, familial melanoma syndrome)
Ephelis (freckle)
Epithelioid blue nevus
Generalized lentiginosis
Giant pigmented nevus (bathing trunk nevus, congenital nevomelanocytic nevus, garment nevus, giant hairy nevus, nevus pigmentosus et pilosus)
Halo nevus (leukoderma acquisitum centrifugum, perinevoid vitiligo, Sutton nevus)
Hori's nevus (acquired bilateral nevus of Ota-like macules)
Inherited patterned lentiginosis in black persons
Ink spot lentigo (sunburn lentigo)
Laugier–Hunziker syndrome
Lentigo simplex (simple lentigo)
Malignant blue nevus
Medium-sized congenital nevocytic nevus
Melanoacanthoma
Melanocytic tumors of uncertain malignant potential
Moynahan syndrome
Mucosal lentigines (labial and penile and vulvar melanosis, melanotic macules)
Nevus of Ito (nevus fuscoceruleus acromiodeltoideus)
Nevus of Ota (congenital melanosis bulbi, melanosis bulborum and aberrant dermal melanocytosis, nevus fuscoceruleus ophthalmomaxillaris, oculodermal melanocytosis, oculomucodermal melanocytosis)
Nevus spilus (speckled lentiginous nevus, zosteriform lentiginous nevus)
Partial unilateral lentiginosis (segmental lentiginosis)
Peutz–Jeghers syndrome
Pigmented spindle cell nevus (pigmented spindle cell tumor of Reed, pigmented variant of Spitz nevus)
Pseudomelanoma (recurrent melanocytic nevus, recurrent nevus)
PUVA lentigines
Small-sized congenital nevocytic nevus
Spitz nevus (benign juvenile melanoma, epithelioid and spindle cell nevus, Spitz's juvenile melanoma)
Solar lentigo (lentigo senilis, liver spot, old age spot, senile freckle)

Melanoma 

Melanoma is a malignant proliferation of melanocytes and the most aggressive type of skin cancer.

Acral lentiginous melanoma 
Amelanotic melanoma
Animal-type melanoma
Desmoplastic melanoma (neurotropic melanoma, spindled melanoma)
Lentigo maligna (lentiginous melanoma on sun-damaged skin)
Lentigo maligna melanoma
Melanoma with features of a Spitz nevus (Spitzoid melanoma)
Melanoma with small nevus-like cells (small cell melanoma)
Mucosal melanoma
Nevoid melanoma
Nodular melanoma
Polypoid melanoma
Seborrheic keratosis-like melanoma
Soft-tissue melanoma (clear-cell sarcoma, melanoma of the soft parts)
Superficial spreading melanoma (superficially spreading melanoma)
Uveal melanoma

Monocyte- and macrophage-related 

Monocyte- and macrophage-related cutaneous conditions are characterized histologically by infiltration of the skin by monocyte or macrophage cells, often divided into several categories, including granulomatous disease, histiocytoses, and sarcoidosis.

Actinic granuloma (O'Brien granuloma)
Annular elastolytic giant cell granuloma (giant cell elastophagocytosis, Meischer's granuloma, Miescher's granuloma of the face)
Annular sarcoidosis 
Benign cephalic histiocytosis (histiocytosis with intracytoplasmic worm-like bodies)
Congenital self-healing reticulohistiocytosis (Hashimoto–Pritzker disease, Hashimoto–Pritzker syndrome)
Erythrodermic sarcoidosis
Generalized eruptive histiocytoma (eruptive histiocytoma, generalized eruptive histiocytosis)
Generalized granuloma annulare
Giant cell reticulohistiocytoma (solitary reticulohistiocytoma, solitary reticulohistiocytosis)
Granuloma annulare in HIV disease
Granuloma multiforme (Mkar disease, granuloma multiforme (Leiker))
Hand–Schüller–Christian disease
Heerfordt's syndrome
Hereditary progressive mucinous histiocytosis
Hypopigmented sarcoidosis
Ichthyosiform sarcoidosis
Indeterminate cell histiocytosis
Interstitial granulomatous drug reaction
Langerhans cell histiocytosis (histiocytosis X)
Letterer–Siwe disease
Localized granuloma annulare
Löfgren syndrome
Lupus pernio
Morpheaform sarcoidosis
Mucosal sarcoidosis
Multicentric reticulohistiocytosis
Necrobiotic xanthogranuloma (necrobiotic xanthogranuloma with paraproteinemia)
Non-X histiocytosis
Papular sarcoid
Papular xanthoma
Patch-type granuloma annulare (macular granuloma annulare)
Perforating granuloma annulare 
Progressive nodular histiocytosis
Reticulohistiocytoma
Scar sarcoid (sarcoidosis in scars)
Sea-blue histiocytosis
Subcutaneous granuloma annulare (deep granuloma annulare, pseudorheumatoid nodule)
Subcutaneous sarcoidosis (Darier–Roussy disease, Darier–Roussy sarcoid)
Systemic sarcoidosis
Ulcerative sarcoidosis
Xanthoma disseminatum (disseminated xanthosiderohistiocytosis, Montgomery syndrome)

Mucinoses 

Mucinoses are a group of conditions caused by dermal fibroblasts producing abnormally large amounts of mucopolysaccharides.

Acral persistent papular mucinosis
Atypical lichen myxedematosus (intermediate lichen myxedematosus)
Atypical tuberous myxedema (Jadassohn–Dosseker syndrome)
Cutaneous focal mucinosis
Cutaneous lupus mucinosis (papular and nodular mucinosis in lupus erythematosus, papular and nodular mucinosis of Gold, papulonodular mucinosis in lupus erythematosus)
Discrete papular lichen myxedematosus
Eccrine mucinosis
Follicular mucinosis (alopecia mucinosa, mucinosis follicularis, Pinkus' follicular mucinosis, Pinkus' follicular mucinosis–benign primary form)
Localized lichen myxedematosus
Myxoid cyst (digital mucous cyst, mucous cyst)
Myxoid lipoblastoma
Neuropathia mucinosa cutanea
Nodular lichen myxedematosus
Papular mucinosis (generalized lichen myxedematosus, sclerodermoid lichen myxedematosus, scleromyxedema)
Papular mucinosis of infancy (cutaneous mucinosis of infancy)
Perifollicular mucinosis
Reticular erythematous mucinosis (midline mucinosis, plaque-like cutaneous mucinosis, REM syndrome)
Scleroderma
Self-healing juvenile cutaneous mucinosis
Self-healing papular mucinosis
Stiff skin syndrome (congenital fascial dystrophy)

Neurocutaneous 

Neurocutaneous conditions are due organic nervous system disease or are psychiatric in etiology.

Atypical chronic pain syndrome
Body dysmorphic disorder (dysmorphic syndrome, dysmorphophobia)
Brachioradial pruritus
Bromidrosiphobia
Complex regional pain syndrome (reflex sympathetic dystrophy)
Congenital insensitivity to pain with anhidrosis
Delusional parasitosis (delusions of parasitosis, Ekbom syndrome, monosymptomatic hypochondriacal psychosis)
Dermatothlasia
Factitious dermatitis (dermatitis artefacta, factitial dermatitis) 
Glossodynia (burning mouth syndrome, burning tongue, orodynia)
Levator ani syndrome
Malum perforans pedis (neurotrophic ulcer, perforating ulcer of the foot)
Meralgia paresthetica (Roth–Bernhardt disease)
Neurotic excoriations
Notalgia paresthetica (hereditary localized pruritus, posterior pigmented pruritic patch, subscapular pruritus)
Postencephalitic trophic ulcer
Psychogenic pruritus
Riley–Day syndrome (familial dysautonomia)
Scalp dysesthesia
Sciatic nerve injury
Scrotodynia
Syringomyelia (Morvan's disease)
Traumatic neuroma (amputation neuroma)
Trichotillomania (trichotillosis)
Trigeminal neuralgia (tic douloureux)
Trigeminal trophic lesion (trigeminal trophic syndrome)
Vulvodynia (vestibulodynia)

Noninfectious immunodeficiency-related 

Noninfectious immunodeficiency-related cutaneous conditions are caused by T-cell or B-cell dysfunction.

Bare lymphocyte syndrome
Chronic granulomatous disease (Bridges–Good syndrome, chronic granulomatous disorder, Quie syndrome)
Common variable immunodeficiency (acquired hypogammaglobulinemia)
Complement deficiency
DiGeorge syndrome (DiGeorge anomaly, thymic hypoplasia)
Graft-versus-host disease
Griscelli syndrome
Hyper-IgE syndrome (Buckley syndrome, Job syndrome)
Immunodeficiency with hyper-IgM
Immunodeficiency–centromeric instability–facial anomalies syndrome (ICF syndrome)
Isolated IgA deficiency
Isolated primary IgM deficiency
Janus kinase 3 deficiency
Leukocyte adhesion molecule deficiency
LIG4 syndrome
Myeloperoxidase deficiency
Neutrophil immunodeficiency syndrome
Nezelof syndrome (thymic dysplasia with normal immunoglobulins)
Omenn syndrome 
Purine nucleoside phosphorylase deficiency
Severe combined immunodeficiency (alymphocytosis, Glanzmann–Riniker syndrome, severe mixed immunodeficiency syndrome, thymic alymphoplasia)
Shwachman–Bodian–Diamond syndrome
Thymoma with immunodeficiency (Good syndrome)
Transient hypogammaglobulinemia of infancy
Warts–hypogammaglobulinemia–infections–myelokathexis syndrome (WHIM syndrome)
Wiskott–Aldrich syndrome
X-linked agammaglobulinemia (Bruton syndrome, sex-linked agammaglobulinemia)
X-linked hyper-IgM syndrome
X-linked hypogammaglobulinemia
X-linked lymphoproliferative disease (Duncan's disease)
X-linked neutropenia

Nutrition-related 

Nutrition-related cutaneous conditions are caused by malnutrition due to an improper or inadequate diet.

Biotin deficiency
Carotenemia
Essential fatty acid deficiency
Folic acid deficiency
Hypervitaminosis A
Hypovitaminosis A (phrynoderma)
Iron deficiency 
Kwashiorkor
Lycopenemia
Maple syrup urine disease
Marasmus
Niacin deficiency (pellagra, vitamin B3 deficiency)
Selenium deficiency
Vitamin B1 deficiency (beriberi, thiamine deficiency)
Vitamin B12 deficiency (cyanocobalamin deficiency)
Vitamin B2 deficiency (ariboflavinosis, riboflavin deficiency)
Vitamin B6 deficiency (pyridoxine deficiency)
Vitamin B6 excess (pyridoxine excess)
Vitamin C deficiency (scurvy)
Vitamin K deficiency
Zinc deficiency

Papulosquamous hyperkeratotic 

Papulosquamous hyperkeratotic cutaneous conditions are those that present with papules and scales caused by a thickening of the stratum corneum.

Confluent and reticulated papillomatosis (confluent and reticulated papillomatosis of Gougerot and Carteaud, familial cutaneous papillomatosis, familial occurrence of confluent and reticulated papillomatosis)
Digitate dermatosis
Drug-induced keratoderma
Exfoliative dermatitis (dermatitis exfoliativa, erythroderma, red man syndrome)
Florid cutaneous papillomatosis
Granular parakeratosis (axillary granular parakeratosis, intertriginous granular parakeratosis)
Keratolysis exfoliativa (lamellar dyshidrosis, recurrent focal palmar peeling, recurrent palmar peeling)
Keratosis punctata of the palmar creases (hyperkeratosis penetrans, hyperkeratosis punctata, keratodermia punctata, keratosis punctata, keratotic pits of the palmar creases, lenticular atrophia of the palmar creases, punctate keratosis of the palmar creases)
Meesmann corneal dystrophy
Paraneoplastic keratoderma
Pityriasis rosea (pityriasis rosea Gibert)
Pityriasis rubra pilaris (Devergie's disease, lichen ruber acuminatus, lichen ruber pilaris)
Pure hair-nail type ectodermal dysplasia
Small plaque parapsoriasis (chronic superficial dermatitis)
Tripe palms
Xanthoerythrodermia perstans

Palmoplantar keratodermas 

Palmoplantar keratodermas are a diverse group of hereditary and acquired keratodermas in which there is hyperkeratosis of the skin of the palms and soles.

Acrokeratoelastoidosis of Costa (keratoelastoidosis marginalis)
Aquagenic keratoderma (acquired aquagenic palmoplantar keratoderma, aquagenic syringeal acrokeratoderma, aquagenic wrinkling of the palms, transient reactive papulotranslucent acrokeratoderma)
Bart–Pumphrey syndrome (palmoplantar keratoderma with knuckle pads and leukonychia and deafness)
Camisa disease
Carvajal syndrome (striate palmoplantar keratoderma with woolly hair and cardiomyopathy, striate palmoplantar keratoderma with woolly hair and left ventricular dilated cardiomyopathy)
Corneodermatoosseous syndrome (CDO syndrome)
Diffuse epidermolytic palmoplantar keratoderma (palmoplantar keratoderma cum degeneratione granulosa Vörner, Vörner's epidermolytic palmoplantar keratoderma, Vörner keratoderma)
Diffuse nonepidermolytic palmoplantar keratoderma (diffuse orthohyperkeratotic keratoderma, hereditary palmoplantar keratoderma, keratosis extremitatum progrediens, keratosis palmoplantaris diffusa circumscripta, tylosis, Unna–Thost disease, Unna–Thost keratoderma)
Erythrokeratodermia variabilis (erythrokeratodermia figurata variabilis, keratosis extremitatum progrediens, keratosis palmoplantaris transgrediens et progrediens, Mendes da Costa syndrome, Mendes da Costa type erythrokeratodermia, progressive symmetric erythrokeratoderma)
Focal acral hyperkeratosis (acrokeratoelastoidosis lichenoides, degenerative collagenous plaques of the hand)
Focal palmoplantar and gingival keratosis
Focal palmoplantar keratoderma with oral mucosal hyperkeratosis (focal epidermolytic palmoplantar keratoderma, hereditary painful callosities, hereditary painful callosity syndrome, keratosis follicularis, keratosis palmoplantaris nummularis, nummular epidermolytic palmoplantar keratoderma)
Haim–Munk syndrome (palmoplantar keratoderma with periodontitis and arachnodactyly and acro-osteolysis)
Hidrotic ectodermal dysplasia (alopecia congenita with keratosis palmoplantaris, Clouston syndrome, Clouston's hidrotic ectodermal dysplasia, Fischer–Jacobsen–Clouston syndrome, keratosis palmaris with drumstick fingers, palmoplantar keratoderma and clubbing)
Howel–Evans syndrome (familial keratoderma with carcinoma of the esophagus, focal non-epidermolytic palmoplantar keratoderma with carcinoma of the esophagus, palmoplantar ectodermal dysplasia type III, palmoplantar keratoderma associated with esophageal cancer, tylosis, tylosis–esophageal carcinoma)
Hystrix-like ichthyosis–deafness syndrome (HID syndrome)
Keratoderma climactericum (acquired plantar keratoderma, climacteric keratoderma, Haxthausen's disease)
Keratosis punctata palmaris et plantaris (Buschke–Fischer–Brauer disease, Davis Colley disease, keratoderma disseminatum palmaris et plantaris, keratosis papulosa, keratoderma punctatum, keratodermia punctata, keratoma hereditarium dissipatum palmare et plantare, palmar and plantar seed dermatoses, palmar keratoses, papulotranslucent acrokeratoderma, punctate keratoderma, punctate keratoses of the palms and soles, maculosa disseminata)
Keratitis–ichthyosis–deafness syndrome (erythrokeratodermia progressiva Burns, ichthyosiform erythroderma with corneal involvement and deafness, KID syndrome)
Mal de Meleda (acral keratoderma, Gamborg–Nielsen keratoderma, mutilating palmoplantar keratoderma of the Gamborg–Nielsen type, palmoplantar ectodermal dysplasia type VIII, palmoplantar keratoderma of the Norrbotten type)
Naxos syndrome (diffuse non-epidermolytic palmoplantar keratoderma with woolly hair and cardiomyopathy, diffuse palmoplantar keratoderma with woolly hair and arrythmogenic right ventricular cardiomyopathy of Naxos, Naxos disease)
Olmsted syndrome (mutilating palmoplantar keratoderma with periorificial keratotic plaques, mutilating palmoplantar keratoderma with periorificial plaques, polykeratosis of Touraine)
Pachyonychia congenita type I (Jadassohn–Lewandowsky syndrome)
Pachyonychia congenita type II (Jackson–Lawler pachyonychia congenita, Jackson–Sertoli syndrome)
Palmoplantar keratoderma and spastic paraplegia (Charcot–Marie–Tooth disease with palmoplantar keratoderma and nail dystrophy)
Palmoplantar keratoderma of Sybert (Greither palmoplantar keratoderma, Greither syndrome, keratosis extremitatum hereditaria progrediens, keratosis palmoplantaris transgrediens et progrediens, Sybert keratoderma, transgrediens and progrediens palmoplantar keratoderma)
Papillon–Lefèvre syndrome (palmoplantar keratoderma with periodontitis)
Porokeratosis plantaris discreta
Punctate palmoplantar keratoderma
Schöpf–Schulz–Passarge syndrome (eyelid cysts with palmoplantar keratoderma and hypodontia and hypotrichosis)
Scleroatrophic syndrome of Huriez (Huriez syndrome, palmoplantar keratoderma with scleroatrophy, palmoplantar keratoderma with sclerodactyly, scleroatrophic and keratotic dermatosis of the limbs, sclerotylosis)
Striate palmoplantar keratoderma (acral keratoderma, Brünauer–Fuhs–Siemens type of palmoplantar keratoderma, focal non-epidermolytic palmoplantar keratoderma, keratosis palmoplantaris varians, palmoplantar keratoderma areata, palmoplantar keratoderma striata, Wachter keratoderma, Wachters palmoplantar keratoderma)
Spiny keratoderma (porokeratosis punctata palmaris et plantaris, punctate keratoderma, punctate porokeratosis of the palms and soles)
Tyrosinemia type II (oculocutaneous tyrosinemia, Richner–Hanhart syndrome)
Vohwinkel syndrome (keratoderma hereditaria mutilans, keratoma hereditaria mutilans, mutilating keratoderma of Vohwinkel, mutilating palmoplantar keratoderma)

Pregnancy-related 

Pregnancy-related cutaneous conditions are a group of skin changes observed during pregnancy.

Impetigo herpetiformis
Intrahepatic cholestasis of pregnancy (cholestasis of pregnancy, jaundice of pregnancy, obstetric cholestasis, prurigo gravidarum)
Linea nigra
Pemphigoid gestationis (gestational pemphigoid, herpes gestationis)
Prurigo gestationis (Besnier prurigo, early-onset prurigo of pregnancy, linear IgM dermatosis of pregnancy, papular dermatitis of pregnancy, prurigo of pregnancy, Spangler's papular dermatitis of pregnancy)
Pruritic folliculitis of pregnancy
Pruritic urticarial papules and plaques of pregnancy (late-onset prurigo of pregnancy, polymorphic eruption of pregnancy, PUPPP syndrome, toxemic rash of pregnancy, toxic erythema of pregnancy)
Striae gravidarum

Pruritic 

Pruritus, commonly known as itchiness, is a sensation exclusive to the skin, and characteristic of many skin conditions.

Adult blaschkitis
Aquadynia
Aquagenic pruritus
Biliary pruritus
Cholestatic pruritus
Drug-induced pruritus
Hydroxyethyl starch-induced pruritus
Lichen simplex chronicus (neurodermatitis) 
Prion pruritus
Prurigo nodularis
Prurigo pigmentosa
Prurigo simplex
Pruritus ani
Pruritus scroti
Pruritus vulvae
Puncta pruritica (itchy points)
Scalp pruritus
Senile pruritus
Uremic pruritus (renal pruritus)

Psoriasis 

Psoriasis is a common, chronic, and recurrent inflammatory disease of the skin characterized by circumscribed, erythematous, dry, scaling plaques.

Annular pustular psoriasis
Drug-induced psoriasis
Exanthematic pustular psoriasis
Generalized pustular psoriasis (pustular psoriasis of von Zumbusch)
Guttate psoriasis (eruptive psoriasis)
Inverse psoriasis
Keratoderma blennorrhagica (keratoderma blennorrhagicum)
Localized pustular psoriasis
Napkin psoriasis
Psoriasis vulgaris (chronic stationary psoriasis, plaque-like psoriasis)
Psoriatic arthritis
Psoriatic erythroderma (erythrodermic psoriasis)
Seborrheic-like psoriasis (sebopsoriasis, seborrhiasis)

Reactive neutrophilic 

Reactive neutrophilic cutaneous conditions constitute a spectrum of disease mediated by neutrophils, and typically associated with underlying diseases, such as inflammatory bowel disease and hematologic malignancy.

Acute erythema nodosum
Bowel-associated dermatosis–arthritis syndrome (bowel bypass syndrome, bowel bypass syndrome without bowel bypass, intestinal bypass arthritis–dermatitis syndrome)
Marshall syndrome
Neutrophilic dermatosis of the dorsal hands (pustular vasculitis of the dorsal hands)
Neutrophilic eccrine hidradenitis
Pyoderma gangrenosum
Pyogenic arthritis–pyoderma gangrenosum–acne syndrome (PAPA syndrome)
Rheumatoid neutrophilic dermatitis (rheumatoid neutrophilic dermatosis)
Superficial granulomatous pyoderma
Sweet's syndrome (acute febrile neutrophilic dermatosis)
Sweet's syndrome-like dermatosis
Vesicopustular dermatosis

Recalcitrant palmoplantar eruptions 

Recalcitrant palmoplantar eruptions are skin conditions of the palms and soles which are resistant to treatment.

Dermatitis repens (acrodermatitis continua, acrodermatitis continua of Hallopeau, acrodermatitis continua suppurativa Hallopeau, acrodermatitis perstans, dermatitis repens Crocker, Hallopeau's acrodermatitis, Hallopeau's acrodermatitis continua, pustular acrodermatitis)
Infantile acropustulosis (acropustulosis of infancy)
Palmoplantar pustulosis (persistent palmoplantar pustulosis, pustular psoriasis of the Barber type, pustular psoriasis of the extremities, pustulosis of palms and soles, pustulosis palmaris et plantaris)
Pustular bacterid

Resulting from errors in metabolism 

Skin conditions resulting from errors in metabolism are caused by enzymatic defects that lead to an accumulation or deficiency of various cellular components, including, but not limited to, amino acids, carbohydrates, and lipids.

Acute intermittent porphyria
Adrenoleukodystrophy (Schilder's disease)
Alkaptonuria
Aminolevulinic acid dehydratase deficiency porphyria (Doss porphyria, plumboporphyria)
B-mannosidase deficiency
Carotenosis
Cerebral autosomal dominant arteriopathy with subcortical infarcts and leukoencephalopathy syndrome (CADASIL syndrome)
Cerebrotendinous xanthomatosis
Citrullinemia
Congenital erythropoietic porphyria (Gunther's disease)
Diabetic bulla (bullosis diabeticorum, bullous eruption of diabetes mellitus)
Diabetic cheiroarthropathy
Diabetic dermopathy (shin spots)
Dystrophic calcinosis cutis
Eruptive xanthoma
Erythropoietic protoporphyria 
Fabry disease (Anderson–Fabry disease, angiokeratoma corporis diffusum)
Familial alpha-lipoprotein deficiency (Tangier disease)
Familial amyloid polyneuropathy
Familial apoprotein CII deficiency
Familial combined hyperlipidemia (multiple-type hyperlipoproteinemia)
Familial defective apolipoprotein B-100
Familial dysbetalipoproteinemia (broad beta disease, remnant removal disease)
Familial hypertriglyceridemia
Farber disease (fibrocytic dysmucopolysaccharidosis, lipogranulomatosis)
Fucosidosis
Gaucher's disease
Gout (podagra, urate crystal arthropathy, urate deposition disease)
Hartnup disease (pellagra-like dermatosis)
Hemodialysis-associated amyloidosis
Hepatoerythropoietic porphyria
Hereditary coproporphyria
Hereditary gelsolin amyloidosis
Heredofamilial amyloidosis
Hunter syndrome
Hurler syndrome (gargoylism, mucopolysaccharidosis type I)
Hurler–Scheie syndrome (mucopolysaccharidosis type I H-S)
Hyaluronidase deficiency (mucopolysaccharidosis type IX)
Iatrogenic calcinosis cutis
Idiopathic scrotal calcinosis (idiopathic calcified nodules of the scrotum)
Lafora disease
Lesch–Nyhan syndrome (juvenile gout)
Lichen amyloidosis
Limited joint mobility
Lipoid proteinosis (hyalinosis cutis et mucosae, Urbach–Wiethe disease)
Lipoprotein lipase deficiency (chylomicronemia, chylomicronemia syndrome)
Macular amyloidosis 
Maroteaux–Lamy syndrome (mucopolysaccharidosis type VI)
Medication-induced hyperlipoproteinemia
Metastatic calcinosis cutis
Milia-like calcinosis
Morquio's disease (mucopolysaccharidosis type IV)
Necrobiosis lipoidica (necrobiosis lipoidica diabeticorum)
Niemann–Pick disease
Nodular amyloidosis
Nodular xanthoma
Normolipoproteinemic xanthomatosis
Obstructive liver disease (xanthomatous biliary cirrhosis)
Ochronosis
Osteoma cutis
Palmar xanthoma
Phenylketonuria
Phytosterolemia (sitosterolemia)
Porphyria cutanea tarda
Primary cutaneous amyloidosis
Primary systemic amyloidosis
Prolidase deficiency
Pseudoporphyria (pseudoporphyria cutanea tarda)
Sanfilippo syndrome
Scheie syndrome (mucopolysaccharidosis type I S)
Secondary cutaneous amyloidosis
Secondary systemic amyloidosis
Sialidosis
Sly syndrome (mucopolysaccharidosis type VII)
Subepidermal calcified nodule (solitary congenital nodular calcification, Winer's nodular calcinosis)
Transient erythroporphyria of infancy (purpuric phototherapy-induced eruption) 
Traumatic calcinosis cutis
Tuberoeruptive xanthoma (tuberous xanthoma)
Tumoral calcinosis
Variegate porphyria (mixed hepatic porphyria, mixed porphyria, South African genetic porphyria, South African porphyria)
Verruciform xanthoma
Waxy skin
Wilson's disease (hepatolenticular degeneration)
Xanthelasma palpebrarum (xanthelasma)
Xanthoma diabeticorum
Xanthoma planum (plane xanthoma)
Xanthoma striatum palmare
Xanthoma tendinosum (tendinous xanthoma)
Xanthoma tuberosum

Resulting from physical factors 

Skin conditions resulting from physical factors occur from a number of causes, including, but not limited to, hot and cold temperatures, friction, and moisture.

Abrasion
Acrocyanosis
Actinic prurigo (familial polymorphous light eruption of American Indians, hereditary polymorphous light eruption of American Indians, Hutchinson's summer prurigo, hydroa aestivale)
Aerosol burn
Benign summer light eruption
Beryllium granuloma
Black heel and palm (black heel, calcaneal petechiae, chromidrose plantaire, post-traumatic punctate intraepidermal hemorrhage, tache noir, talon noir)
Callus (callosity, clavus, corn, heloma, heloma durum, heloma molle, intractable plantar keratosis, tyloma)
Carbon stain 
Chilblains (pernio, perniosis)
Chronic actinic dermatitis (actinic reticuloid, chronic photosensitivity dermatitis, persistent light reactivity, photosensitive eczema)
Colloid milium
Coma blister
Coral cut
Delayed blister
Dermatosis neglecta
Edema blister (edema bulla, hydrostatic bulla, stasis blister)
Electrical burn
Equestrian perniosis
Erythema ab igne (fire stains, toasted skin syndrome)
Erythrocyanosis crurum
Favre–Racouchot syndrome (Favre–Racouchot disease, nodular cutaneous elastosis with cysts and comedones)
Foreign body reaction
Fracture blister
Friction blister
Frostbite
Garrod's pad (violinist's viola pad)
Harpist's finger
Heel stick wound
Heat edema
Hot tar burn
Hunan hand syndrome (chili burn)
Hydroa vacciniforme (Bazin's hydroa vacciniforme)
Jogger's nipple
Juvenile spring eruption
Kairo cancer
Kang cancer
Kangri ulcer
Lightning burn
Loop mark
Magnetic resonance imaging burn (MRI burn)
Mercury granuloma
Miliaria crystallina (miliaria crystalline, sudamina)
Miliaria profunda (mammillaria)
Miliaria pustulosa
Miliaria rubra (heat rash, prickly heat)
Narcotic dermopathy
Occlusion miliaria
Painful fat herniation (painful piezogenic pedal papules, piezogenic papules)
Peat fire cancer
Photoaging (dermatoheliosis)
Photosensitivity with HIV infection
Phototoxic tar dermatitis
Photosenitization
Phytophotodermatitis (Berloque dermatitis)
Pinch mark
Polymorphous light eruption (polymorphic light eruption)
Postmiliarial hypohidrosis 
Postoperative hematoma
Pressure ulcer (decubitus ulcer)
Pseudoacanthosis nigricans
Pseudoverrucous papules and nodules
Pulling boat hands
PUVA-induced acrobullous dermatosis
Runner's rump
Sclerosing lymphangiitis
Silica granuloma
Silicone granuloma
Skin pop scar
Skin track
Slap mark
Solar erythema
Soot tattoo
Subcutaneous emphysema
Sucking blister
Sunburn
Surfer's knots
Tattoo
Tennis toe
Thermal burn
Traumatic asphyxia
Trench foot
Tropical anhidrotic asthenia
Tropical immersion foot (paddy foot, paddy-field foot)
Turf toe
Uranium dermatosis
UV-sensitive syndrome
Vibration white finger (dead finger, hand–arm vibration syndrome)
Warm water immersion foot
Weathering nodule of ear
Wrestler's ear (cauliflower ear, traumatic auricular hematoma)
Zirconium granuloma

Ionizing radiation-induced 

Ionizing radiation-induced cutaneous conditions result from exposure to ionizing radiation.

Acute radiodermatitis 
Chronic radiation keratosis
Chronic radiodermatitis
Eosinophilic, polymorphic, and pruritic eruption associated with radiotherapy
Fluoroscopy burn
Radiation acne
Radiation cancer
Radiation dermatitis (radiodermatitis)
Radiation recall reaction
Radiation-induced erythema multiforme
Radiation-induced hypertrophic scar
Radiation-induced keloid
Radiation-induced morphea

Urticaria and angioedema 

Urticaria is a vascular reaction of the skin characterized by the appearance of wheals, which are firm, elevated swellings of the skin. Angioedema, which can occur alone or with
urticaria, is characterized by a well-defined, edematous swelling that involves subcutaneous tissues, abdominal organs, or upper airway.

Acquired C1 esterase inhibitor deficiency
Acute urticaria
Adrenergic urticaria
Anaphylaxis
Aquagenic urticaria
Cholinergic urticaria
Chronic urticaria (ordinary urticaria)
Cold urticaria
Dermatographism (dermographism)
Episodic angioedema with eosinophilia (Gleich's syndrome)
Exercise urticaria (exercise-induced urticaria)
Galvanic urticaria
Heat urticaria
Hereditary angioedema (Quincke's edema)
Localized heat contact urticaria
Mast cell-independent urticaria
Physical urticaria
Primary cold contact urticaria
Pressure urticaria (delayed pressure urticaria)
Reflex cold urticaria
Schnitzler syndrome
Secondary cold contact urticaria
Solar urticaria
Systemic capillary leak syndrome
Urticarial allergic eruption
Urticaria-like follicular mucinosis
Vibratory angioedema

Vascular-related 

Vascular-related cutaneous conditions result from dysfunction of the blood or blood vessels in the dermis, or lymphatics in the subcutaneous tissues.

Aagenaes syndrome
Acroangiodermatitis (acroangiodermatitis of Mali, Mali acroangiodermatitis, Pseudo-Kaposi's sarcoma)
Acrocyanosis
Acute hemorrhagic edema of infancy (acute hemorrhagic edema of childhood, Finkelstein's disease, infantile postinfectious iris-like purpura and edema, medallion-like purpura, purpura en cocarde avec oedema, Seidlmayer syndrome)
Arterial insufficiency ulcer (ischemic ulcer)
Arteriosclerosis obliterans
Bier spots
Blueberry muffin baby
Bonnet–Dechaume–Blanc syndrome (Wyburn–Mason syndrome)
Bullous lymphedema
Bullous small vessel vasculitis (bullous variant of small vessel vasculitis)
Calciphylaxis 
Caput succedaneum
Cholesterol embolus (warfarin blue toe syndrome)
Cobb syndrome
Corona phlebectatica
Cryofibrinogenemic purpura
Cryoglobulinemic purpura
Cryoglobulinemic vasculitis
Cutaneous small-vessel vasculitis (cutaneous leukocytoclastic angiitis, cutaneous leukocytoclastic vasculitis, cutaneous necrotizing venulitis, hypersensitivity angiitis)
Deep venous thrombosis
Disseminated intravascular coagulation
Doucas and Kapetanakis pigmented purpura
Drug-induced purpura
Drug-induced thrombocytopenic purpura
Eczematid-like purpura of Doucas and Kapetanakis
Epidemic dropsy
Erythema elevatum diutinum
Erythromelalgia (acromelalgia, erythermalgia)
Factitial lymphedema (hysterical edema)
Fibrinolysis syndrome (defibrinating syndrome, hypofibrinogenemia)
Food-induced purpura
Generalized essential telangiectasia (general essential telangiectasia)
Giant-cell arteritis
Gougerot–Blum syndrome (pigmented purpuric lichenoid dermatitis, pigmented purpuric lichenoid dermatitis of Gougerot and Blum)
 Granulomatosis with polyangiitis
Harlequin color change
Hematopoietic ulcer
Hennekam syndrome (Hennekam lymphangiectasia-lymphedema syndrome, intestinal lymphagiectasia-lymphedema-mental retardation syndrome)
Henoch–Schönlein purpura (anaphylactoid purpura, purpura rheumatica, Schönlein–Henoch purpura) 
Hereditary hemorrhagic telangiectasia (Osler's disease, Osler–Weber–Rendu disease)
Idiopathic thrombocytopenic purpura (autoimmune thrombocytopenic purpura, Werlhof's disease)
IgA vasculitis
Kawasaki's disease (mucocutaneous lymph node syndrome)
Levamisole-induced vasculitis
Lichen aureus (lichen purpuricus)
Livedo racemosa
Livedo reticularis
Livedoid dermatitis (embolia cutis medicamentosa, Nicolau syndrome)
Livedoid vasculopathy (atrophie blanche, livedo reticularis with summer ulceration, livedoid vasculitis, PURPLE syndrome, segmental hyalinizing vasculitis)
Lymphedema praecox
Lymphedema–distichiasis syndrome
Maffucci syndrome
Majocchi's disease (purpura annularis telangiectodes, purpura annularis telangiectodes of Majocchi)
Malignant atrophic papulosis (Degos' disease)
Marshall–White syndrome
Meige lymphedema
Microscopic polyangiitis (microscopic polyarteritis, microscopic polyarteritis nodosa)
Mondor's disease (Mondor's syndrome of superficial thrombophlebitis)
Neuropathic ulcer (mal perforans)
Njolstad syndrome
Nonne–Milroy–Meige syndrome (hereditary lymphedema, Milroy disease)
Obstructive purpura
Orthostatic purpura (stasis purpura)
Painful bruising syndrome (autoerythrocyte sensitization, Gardner–Diamond syndrome, psychogenic purpura)
Parkes Weber syndrome
Paroxysmal hand hematoma (Achenbach syndrome)
Paroxysmal nocturnal hemoglobinuria
Polyarteritis nodosa (panarteritis nodosa, periarteritis nodosa)
Postcardiotomy syndrome
Perinatal gangrene of the buttock
Pigmentary purpuric eruptions (progressive pigmentary dermatosis, progressive pigmenting purpura, purpura pigmentosa chronica)
Postinflammatory lymphedema
Postmastectomy lymphangiosarcoma (Stewart–Treves syndrome)
Purpura fulminans (purpura gangrenosa)
Purpura secondary to clotting disorders
Purpuric agave dermatitis 
Raynaud phenomenon
Raynaud's disease (primary Raynaud's phenomenon)
Reactive angioendotheliomatosis
Schamberg's disease (progressive pigmentary dermatosis of Schamberg, purpura pigmentosa progressiva, Schamberg's purpura)
Secondary lymphedema
Septic thrombophlebitis
Sinusoidal hemangioma
Sneddon's syndrome (idiopathic livedo reticularis with cerebrovascular accidents)
Solar purpura (actinic purpura, senile purpura)
Stasis dermatitis (congestion eczema, gravitational dermatitis, gravitational eczema, stasis eczema, varicose eczema)
Superficial thrombophlebitis
Takayasu arteritis (aortic arch syndrome, pulseless disease)
Temporal arteritis (cranial arteritis, Horton's disease)
Thromboangiitis obliterans (Buerger's disease)
Thrombotic thrombocytopenic purpura (Moschcowitz syndrome)
Traumatic purpura
Trousseau's syndrome
Unilateral nevoid telangiectasia (nevoid telangiectasia)
Urticarial vasculitis (chronic urticaria as a manifestation of venulitis, hypocomplementemic urticarial vasculitis syndrome, hypocomplementemic vasculitis, unusual lupus-like syndrome)
Venous insufficiency ulceration
Waldenström hyperglobulinemic purpura (purpura hyperglobulinemica)
Waldenström macroglobulinemia
Yellow nail syndrome (primary lymphedema associated with yellow nails and pleural effusion)

See also 
 :Category:Cutaneous conditions
Dermatology
List of conditions associated with café au lait macules
List of contact allergens
List of cutaneous conditions associated with increased risk of nonmelanoma skin cancer
List of cutaneous conditions associated with internal malignancy
List of cutaneous conditions caused by mutations in keratins
List of cutaneous neoplasms associated with systemic syndromes
List of cutaneous conditions caused by problems with junctional proteins
List of dental abnormalities associated with cutaneous conditions
List of genes mutated in cutaneous conditions
List of genes mutated in pigmented cutaneous lesions
List of histologic stains that aid in diagnosis of cutaneous conditions
List of human leukocyte antigen alleles associated with cutaneous conditions
List of immunofluorescence findings for autoimmune bullous conditions
List of inclusion bodies that aid in diagnosis of cutaneous conditions
List of keratins expressed in the human integumentary system
List of migrating cutaneous conditions
List of mites associated with cutaneous reactions
List of radiographic findings associated with cutaneous conditions
List of specialized glands within the human integumentary system
List of spiders associated with cutaneous reactions
List of target antigens in pemphigoid
List of target antigens in pemphigus
List of verrucous carcinoma subtypes
List of xanthoma variants associated with hyperlipoproteinemia subtypes

Footnotes

References

Further reading

External links 

 
 All the Internet - Directory - Main/Health/Conditions_and_Diseases/Skin_Disorders 
 Images in Clinical Dermatology at the New England Journal of Medicine

 
Dermatology-related lists
Lists of diseases